= Dangojeon =

Denomination of the Sangpyeong Tongbo cash coins

Dangojeon (當五錢)
- Joseon
- Value: 5 mun
- Diameter: 30-33 mm
- Thickness: 2 mm
- Composition: Copper-alloy (brass)
- Years of minting: 1883–1892

Obverse
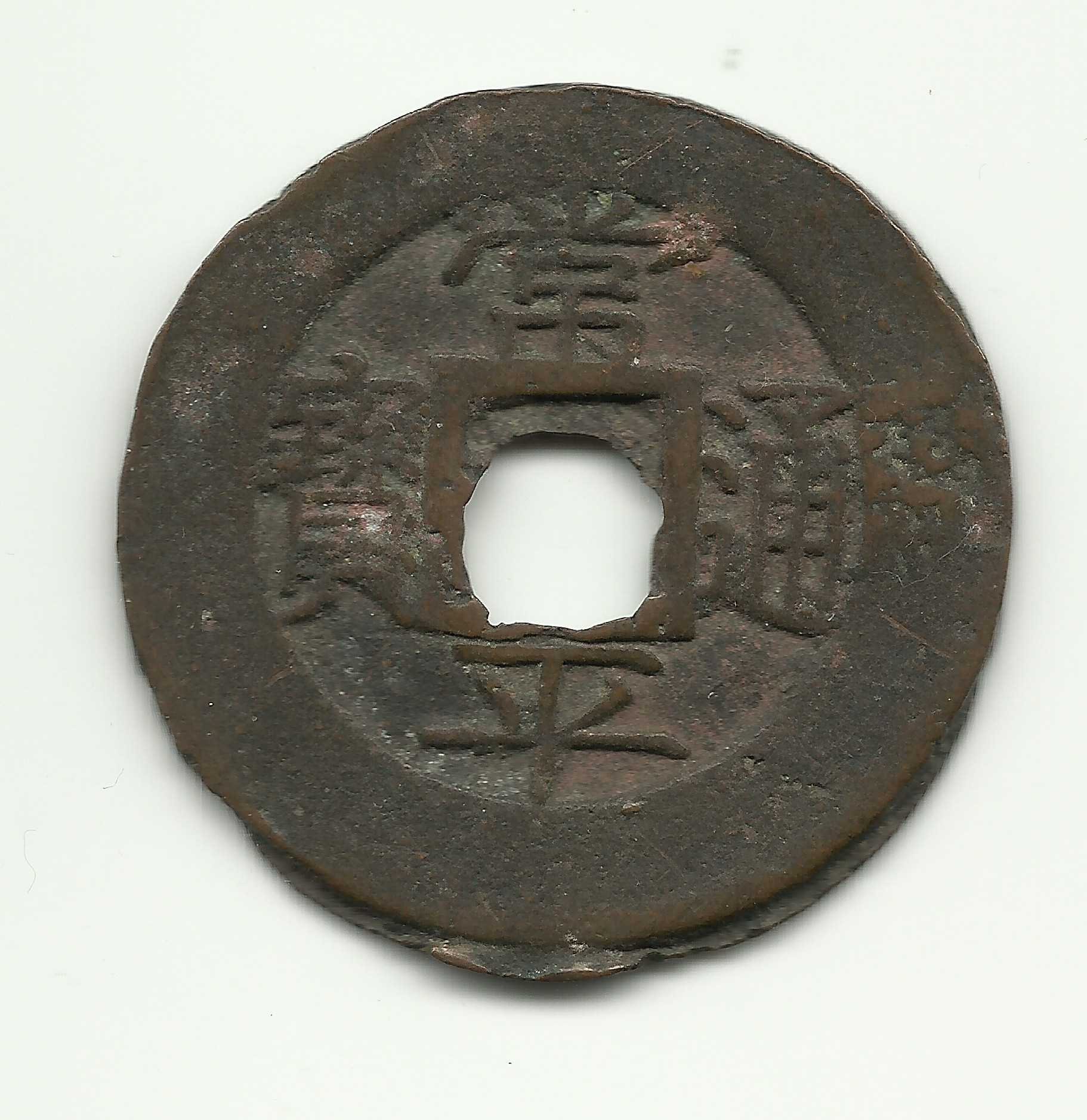
- Design: Sangpyeong Tongbo (常平通寶)
- Design date: 1633
- Design discontinued: 1892

Reverse
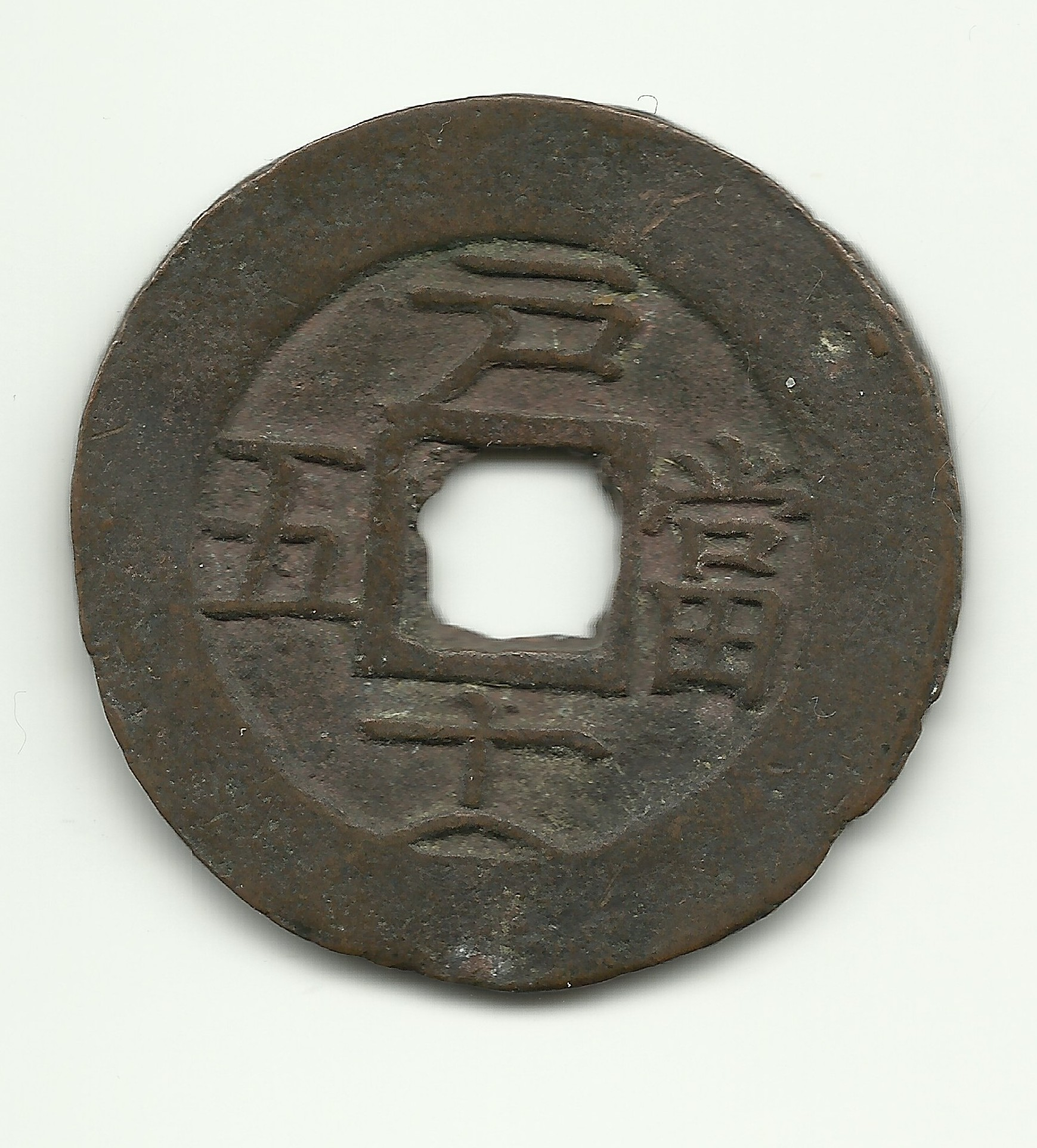
- Design: Dang O (當五) with a mint mark at the top and other marks placed at the bottom.
- Design date: 1883
- Design discontinued: 1892

- Dangojeon
- Hangul: 당오전
- Hanja: 當五錢
- Revised Romanization: Dangojeon
- McCune–Reischauer: Tangochŏn

The Dangojeon (Korean: 당오전; Hanja: 當五錢) refers to the 5 mun denomination of the Sangpyeong Tongbo (常平通寶) Korean cash coins introduced in February 1883 following the disastrous introduction of the earlier Dangbaekjeon (當百錢) two decades earlier. The Dangojeon had a nominal value (or face value) that was five times higher than that of the regular yeopjeon, but its purchasing power was just twice as high, like the previous series of high denomination Sangpyeong Tongbo cash coins, this would prove to be a major cause of inflation and disrupted the Korean economy.

It was cast in order to pay for the expenditures of the state, the casting of the dangojeon was led by the German adviser Paul Georg von Möllendorff. These cash coins would remain in circulation until July 1894.

== Background ==
When the Dangbaekjeon (當百錢), or 100 mun denomination Sangpyeong Tongbo cash coin, was introduced in 1866 by regent Heungseon Daewongun to finance the state's military expenditures to strengthen Korea's military power to be able to compete with that of the Western powers which were forming an ever growing threat, as well as to rebuild the Gyeongbok Palace.

After its introduction the mun started to suffer from inflation, this was because the intrinsic value of the 100 mun coin was only five to six times as much as 5 mun coins, leading to the consumer price of e.g. rice to expand sixfold within 2 years. This eventually lead to traders preferring silver foreign currency such as the Mexican peso, Japanese yen, Russian ruble, and Chinese sycees. As a result of Some people started to melt smaller Sangpyeong Tongbo cash coins down to make counterfeit money. People who had lower denomination Sangpyeong Tongbo avoided to exchange with the value 100 cash coins, so they didn't put their Sangpyeong Tongbo on the market. The new series would be discontinued in April of the year 1867 after being produced only for 172 days. Despite them no longer being produced the government of Joseon continued distributing them onto the Korean market until an appeal from Choe Ik-hyeon convinced the government that these coins had an adverse effect on every class of Korean society.

The introduction of the 100 mun coin happened concurrent with the Tenpō Tsūhō 100 mon coin issued by the Tokugawa shogunate in 1835 (in reaction to government deficit), the 100 wén coin by the Qing dynasty in 1853 (in reaction to the Taiping Rebellion), the Ryukyuan 100 mon and half Shu cash coins, and the large denomination Tự Đức Bảo Sao cash coins in Vietnam. All of these large denomination cash coins also caused inflation on comparable levels.

Following the prohibition of the circulation of the Dangbaekjeon cash coins the government started receiving huge losses. Hence, to secure another source of revenue and to cover its losses, the Joseon government legalise the use of Qing Chinese money in Korea in June 1867. In the 11th year of the reign of King Gojong (1874), in January of that year that Joseon banned the circulation of Chinese cash coins within their borders, since the Chinese money accelerated price hikes.

== History ==
Following the abolition of the Dangbaekjeon, the Korean government introduced the Dangojeon (當五錢, 당오전) in 1883, like the earlier Dangbaekjeon this denomination also caused a sharp decline in the value of coinage which brought a lot of turmoil to the Korean economy. The Dangojeon cash coins were only slightly larger than "value two" Sangpyeong Tongbo cash coins.

The effects that the Dangojeon had caused were not as bad as those that were caused by the gross overvaluing of the Danbaekjeon cash coins, but the effects were nevertheless not beneficial for both the Korean economy and the Korean currency system. Both the Danbaekjeon and the Dangojeon cash coins were symptoms of the considerable turmoil that were occurring within the royal family and its advisers during the reign of King Gojong. From this point onwards, Japanese currency began to flood the Korean market and the Korean mun began to lose its power.

The Korean government was under severe fiscal pressures due to chronic financial difficulties, and new fiscal expenditures such as the costs of dispatching overseas missions, the costs of opening port cities like Busan, Wonsan, and Incheon, and the installation of new military facilities since the opening of Korea in the year 1876. In order to overcome these financial hardships, the Korean government temporarily manufactured the Dae Dong silver coinage in 1882. However, more aggressive monetary reforms were needed to offset rising expenditures since the opening of Korea to foreign trade.

The new Dangojeon coin, which was first circulated by the Korean government between the years 1883 and 1884, was partially to blame for a major increase in the inflation as its nominal value was 5 times that of an average yeopjeon, while in reality its true purchasing power was only twice as much due to the fact that the market accepted the coinage based on it intrinsic value rather than its nominal one. In the period from January of the year 1886 until January of the year 1888, the prices of all commodities in Korea would tremendously increase. Imported cotton cloth was sold at 11 mun a piece, this price was almost twice as much as it had cost in October of the year 1884. The price of domestically produced cotton cloth would also increase during this same period of time from 2 mun to 7.8 mun, and that of silk cloth would increase from 5 mun to 10.7 mun, between October of the year 1884 and January of the year 1886. A similar inflationary trend occurred with the price of rice, it was observed that rice was sold in the range of 9 mun and 23.7 mun between January of the year 1886 and January of the year 1888. This ineffective currency reform that was the introduction of the dangojeon had caused a steep inflation in commodity prices throughout Korea.

One of the demands of the peasant armies of the Donghak Peasant Revolution was the banning of the Dangojeon because of its inflationary effects which severely affected Korea's peasant population.

=== Machine-struck Dangojeon cash coins ===
During the 1890s the Central Government Mint (典圜局, 전원국) created a machine-struck brass Sangpyeong Tongbo cash coin with a round centre hole.

At least three different sets of dies were cut for machine-struck 5 mun Sangpyeong Tongbo cash coins, these designs resembled the 1883 issue 5 mun cast yeopjeon versions of the coins. Only one of these three sets is known to have actually been engraved. In the year 1891 the chief engraver of the Osaka Mint in Japan, Masuda, created this design. Only one of these three designs ever saw (very limited) circulation.

As the Mint's machinery was not well suited for punching centre holes in coins the old-style designs were eventually dropped.

=== Abolition ===
After King Gojong established the Jeonwanguk mint in 1883 in Incheon in order to adopt a currency more akin to international standards leading the copper Sangpyeong Tongbo coins to eventually be phased out in favour of the silver yang following the adoption of the silver standard.

== Design ==
The design of the Dangojeon had the same obverse inscription as other Sangpyeong Tongbo (常平通寶) cash coins, but contained the Hanja characters "當" (당, dang) on the right side of its reverse, and the character "五" (오, o) on its left. As it was minted by various mints it contains different mint marks above the square centre hole on its reverse, and a "furnace designator" or "series number" below the hole.

== See also ==
- Daqian

== Sources ==
- Bank of Korea (韓國銀行) - 韓國의 貨幣 / Korean Money (in Korean using mixed script and English). Publisher: Bank of Korea Publishing (韓國銀行 發券部), Seoul (1982).
- Bank of Korea (韓國銀行) (1994). "韓國의 貨幣 / Korean Currency" (in Korean). Seoul: Bank of Korea Publishing (韓國銀行 發券部).
- C.T. Gardner - The Coinage of Corea and their Values. ASIN B0007JDTW0, 60 pages (1 January 1963).
- Standard Catalog of World Coins – 1801–1900 (6th ed.). Krause Publications. 2009.
