= Dangbaekjeon =

Coin

DangBaekJeon (當百錢)
- Joseon
- Value: 100 mun
- Mass: 25.1 g
- Thickness: 2.8 mm
- Composition: Copper-alloy (brass)
- Years of minting: 1866–1867
- Mintage: 1,784,038

Obverse
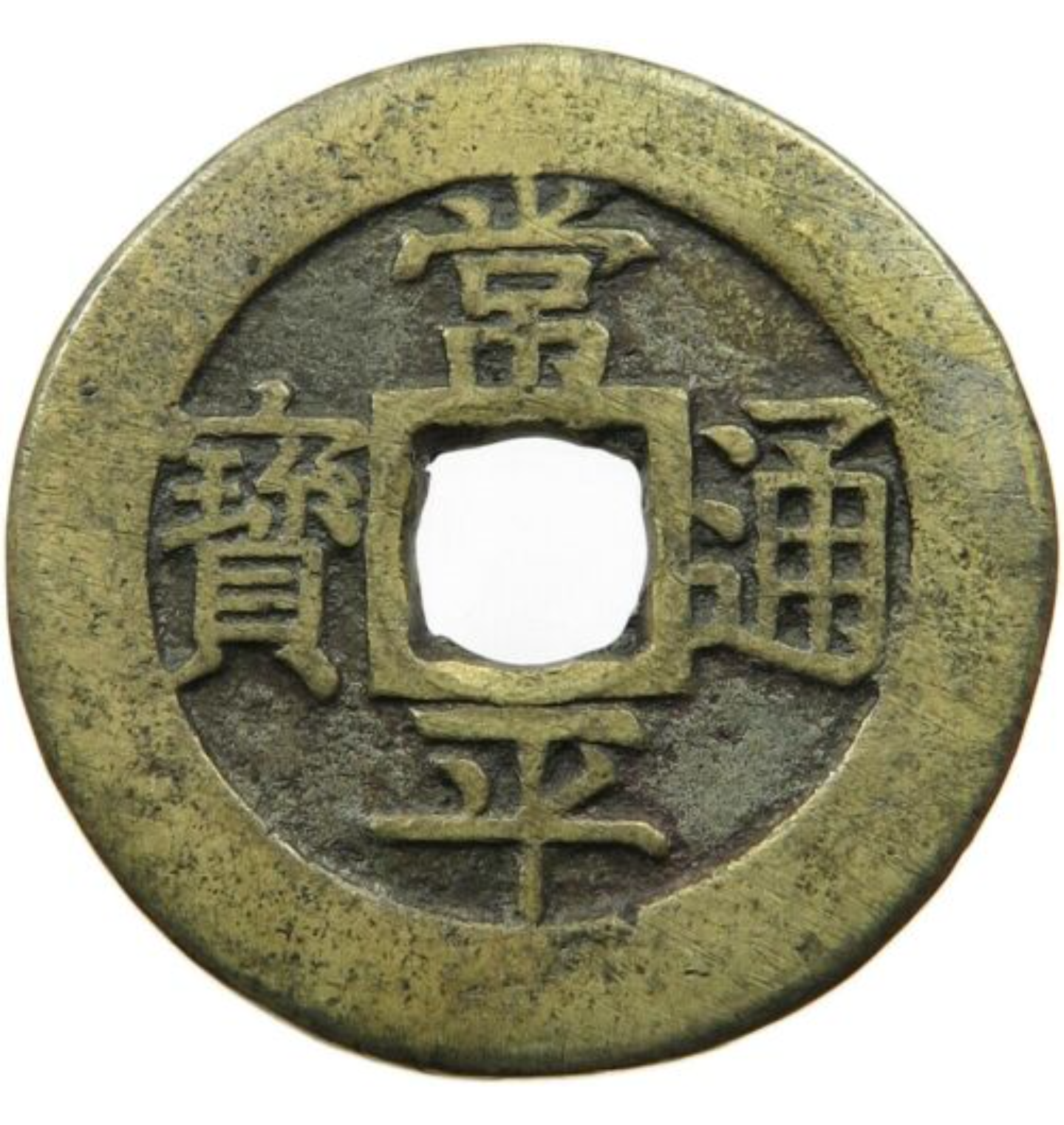
- Design: Sangpyeong Tongbo (常平通寶)
- Design discontinued: 1892

Reverse
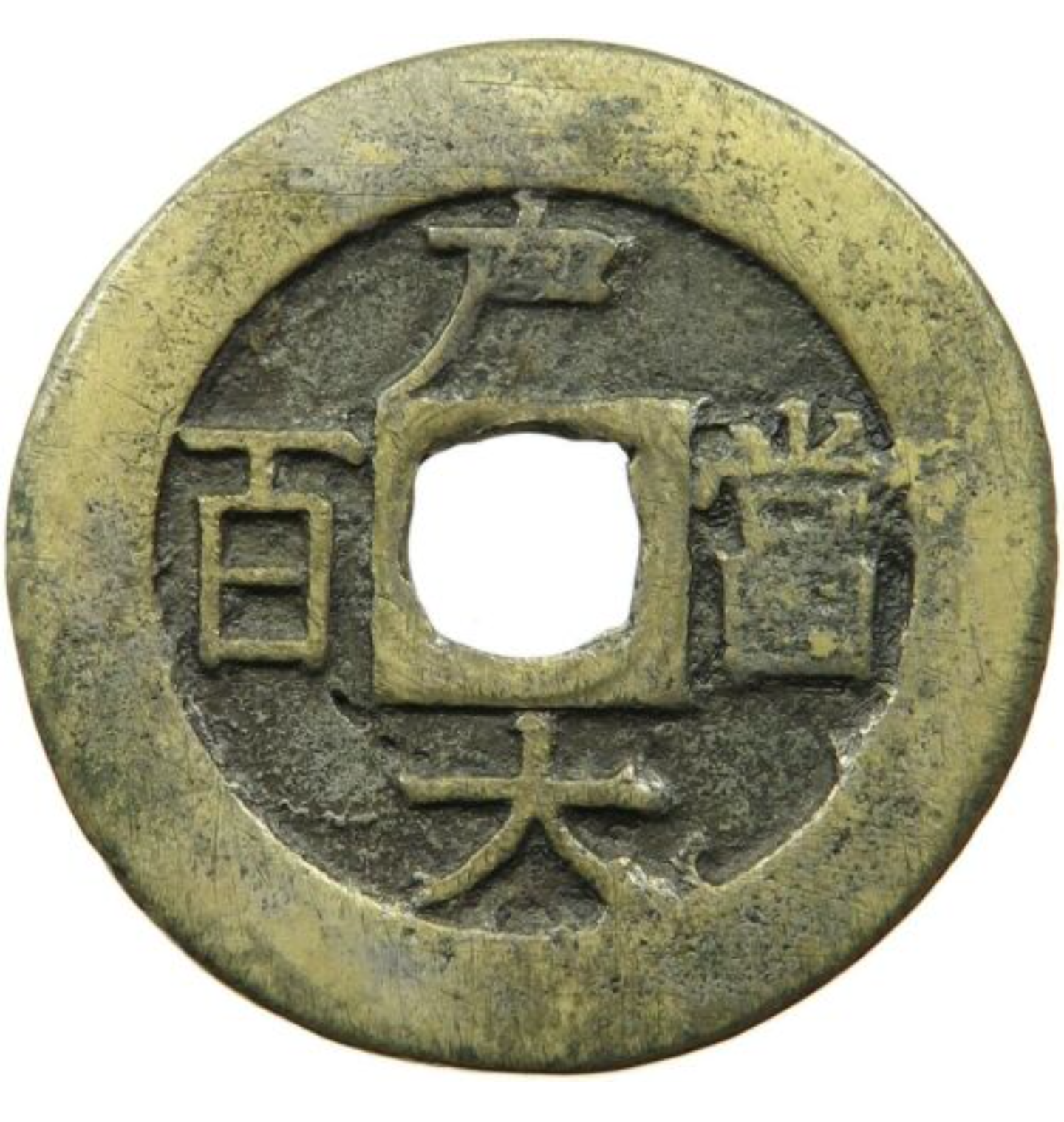
- Design: Ho Dae Dang Baek (户大當百)
- Design discontinued: 1867

- Dangbaekjeon
- Hangul: 당백전
- Hanja: 當百錢
- Revised Romanization: Dangbaekjeon
- McCune–Reischauer: Tangbaekchŏn

The Dangbaekjeon (Korean: 당백전; Hanja: 當百錢) refers to a series of cash coins that were used during late Joseon period of Korean history. It was first issued in November of the year 1866 (Gojong 3) by the order of Heungseon Daewongun.

The hanja is inscribed on both sides of the coin. Words inscribed on the front side is Sangpyeong Tongbo (상평통보; 常平通寶), and on the back side, Hoe Dae Dang Baek (호대당백; 戶大當百). Hoe (호, 戶) stands for HoeJeo (호조, 戶曹), Joseon's ministry of revenue. Dae (대, 大) is a modifier which may be interpreted as 'the great'. Dang Baek (당백, 當百) means 'this coin worth 100 coins' in reference to the coins of 1 mun.

As inscribed, it was worth 100 mun, which values it 100 times more than ordinary yeopjeon, and it would soon cause fatal inflation in the Joseon economy. It was lapsed in April 1867, after only 6 months of use.

== History ==
=== Issuing ===
In 1866 (third year of King Gojong's reign), the royal authority of Joseon had decreased in power. To gain back his authority, Heungseon Daewongun planned the rebuilding of Gyeongbok Palace. Also, the military power had to be strengthened in order to protect Joseon from the invasion of Western countries. However, at that time, the financial difficulties of Joseon were serious. So, the government needed to get a large amount of money to proceed that plans and Daewongun ordered to issue new Sangpyeong Tongbo cash coin with a denomination of 100 mun, called the DangBaekJeon, in Hoe Jeo (호조; 戶曹), Joseon's ministry of revenue. Also, Daewongun ordered to abandon the Kapsan mountain copper mine which was the largest mine of copper in Joseon, the government needed to solve the problem of supplying ingredients that were needed to make more Sangpyeong Tongbo cash coins. Therefore, the government issued higher valued coins using the same amount of materials. To stimulate the circulation after issuing of DangBaekJeon, the Joseon government ordered to use both DangBaekjeon and lower denomination of the Sangpyeong Tongbo cash coins together at every trade or monetary exchange.

=== Problems ===
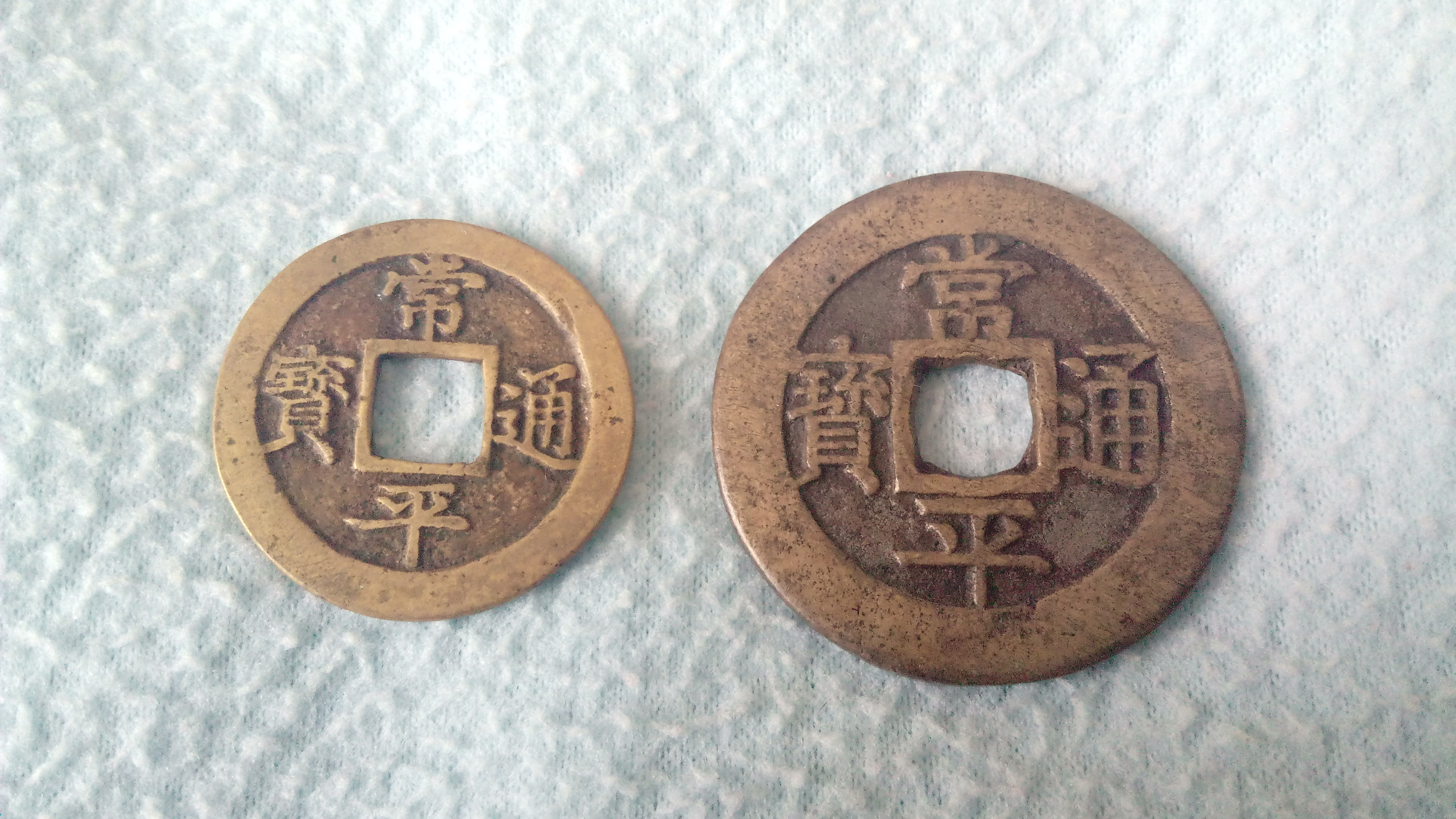
A size comparison between the dangijeon (2 mun cash coin) and dangbaekjeon (100 mun cash coins).

The DangBaekJeon had a lot of serious problems. First, 100 Mun was a big unit for common people. They couldn't use the coins and could only trade with each other. DangBaekJeon was sometimes used in big transactions, but it wasn't necessary for common people, who usually deal in small units. Second, the real value and the nominal value had a big gap. While the nominal value of DangBaekJeon was 100 times as much as the standard 1 mun Sangpyeong Tongbo, the intrinsic value of the coin was only five to six times as much as the value 1 Sangpyeong Tongbo. Since currencies that have a big gap between the real value and the nominal value was hard to be accepted, it was unappreciated from people. Third, the government used DangBaekJeon only as a means of purchasing goods but didn't accept it when they pay taxes. This resulted in a decline in public confidence of the coin.

Therefore, as more DangBaekJeon cash coins kept being issued, hyperinflation occurred. The price of one koku (섬; 石) of rice (one koku of rice is 144kg), which used to be 7 to 8 nyang (냥; 兩), jumped about six times at the beginning of its issue. Some people started to melt Sangpyeong Tongbo and make counterfeit money. People who had Sangpyeong Tongbo avoided to exchange with DangBaekJeon, so they didn't put Sangpyeong Tongbo on the market.

As a result, DangBaekJeon became bad money, and lower denomination Sangpyeong Tongbo became good money. This is related to Gresham's law, which is a monetary principle stating that "bad money drives out good".

The introduction of the 100 mun coin happened concurrent with the Tenpō Tsūhō 100 mon coin issued by the Tokugawa shogunate in 1835 (in reaction to government deficit), the 100 wén coin by the Qing dynasty in 1853 (in reaction to the Taiping Rebellion), the Ryukyuan 100 mon and half Shu cash coins, and the large denomination Tự Đức Bảo Sao cash coins in Vietnam. All of these large denomination cash coins also caused inflation on comparable levels.

=== Disposal ===
The casting of DangBaekJeon was officially stopped on 16 June 1867, after a total of 172 days from the date of first production to the date of their discontinuation. The next year, its distribution was stopped because of an appeal from Choe Ik-hyeon (최익현; 崔益鉉), a janglyeong (장령; 掌令) in Joseon Dynasty. He insisted that the DangBaekJeon adversely affected all classes of Korean society in its two years of circulation. After its distribution had stopped, DangBaekJeon was exchanged with lower denomination Sangpyeong Tongbo cash coins or Chinese money (청전; 掌令) and was used in iron.

Following the abolition of the Dangbaekjeon, the Korean government introduced the Dangojeon (當五錢, 당오전) in 1883. Like the earlier Dangbaekjeon, this denomination also caused a sharp decline in the value of coinage which brought a lot of turmoil to the Korean economy. From this point onwards, Japanese currency began to flood the Korean market and the Korean mun began to lose its power.

== Estimation ==
The Dangbaekjeon is a good example of what happens when money is issued ignoring the real value and the nation's chances of guarantee. It did not just end with inflation, it destroyed the economy of Joseon. When the era of Heungseon Daewongun passed and King Gojong started politics, the reduction in armaments brought Ganghwa Island incident. And due to the lack of national finance, the Imo Incident occurred. The Bank of Korea (the central bank of the modern Republic of Korea) is also regarded as a bad history of the issuance policy. The value of Dangbaekjeon was so bad that the people called it Ttangdon (땅돈), and it changes the pronunciation to Ttaengjeon (땡전). In Korea, an old saying "Ttangjeon han pun eopda" (땡전 한 푼 없다) is often used, which means “I'm penniless.”

== See also ==
- Daqian
- Great Qing Treasure Note
- Tenpō Tsūhō
- Tự Đức Bảo Sao

== Sources ==
- Bank of Korea (韓國銀行) - 韓國의 貨幣 / Korean Money (in Korean using mixed script and English). Publisher: Bank of Korea Publishing (韓國銀行 發券部), Seoul (1982).
- Bank of Korea (韓國銀行) - 韓國의 貨幣 / Korean Currency (in Korean using mixed script and English). Publisher: Bank of Korea Publishing (韓國銀行 發券部), Seoul (1994).
- C.T. Gardner - The Coinage of Corea and their Values. ASIN B0007JDTW0, 60 pages (1 January 1963).
