= Korean mun =

1625–1892 currency of Joseon

文 / 문 (Korean)
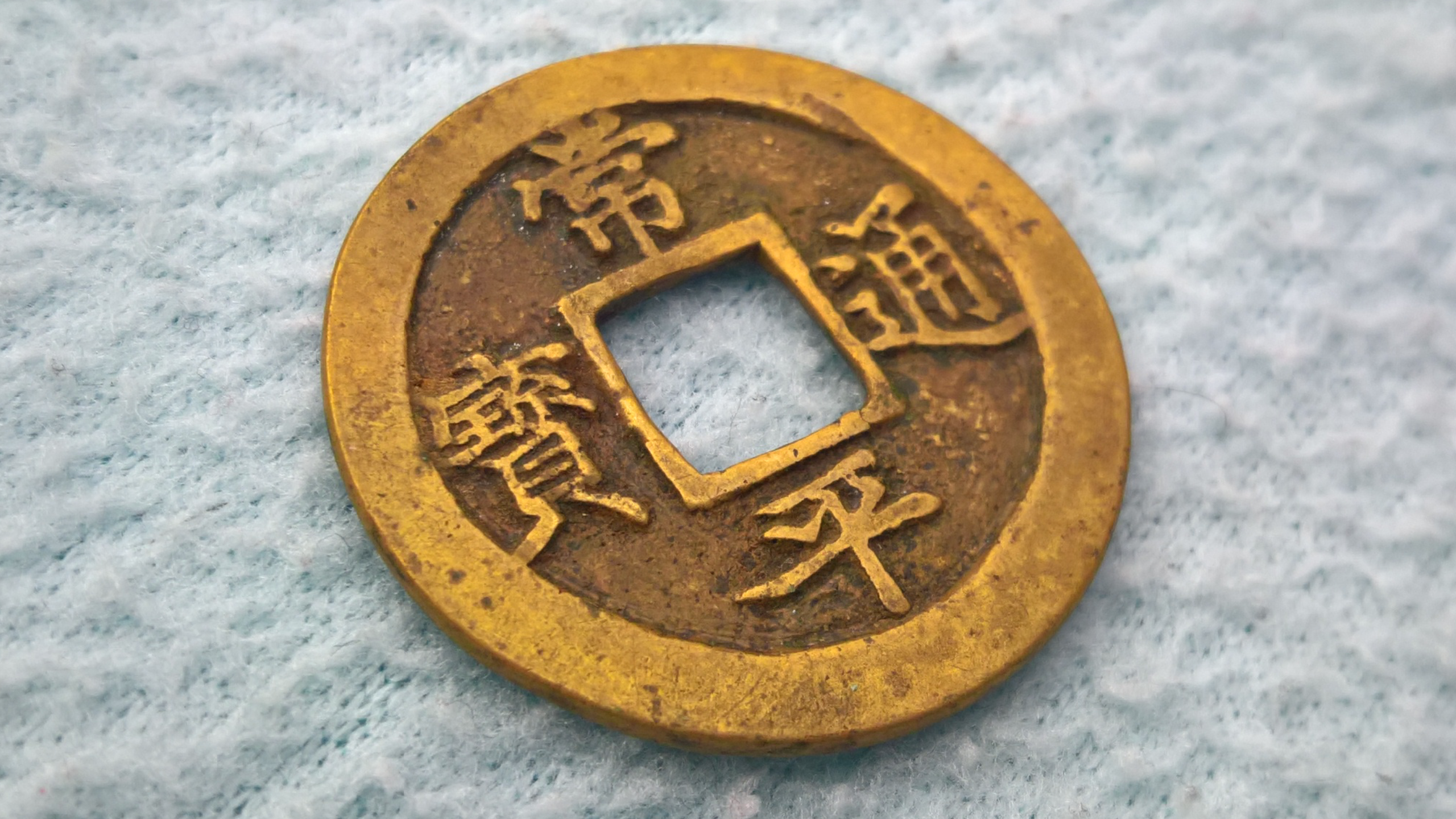
- A Sangpyeong Tongbo (常平通寶) cash coin issued by the Treasury Department Mint (戶).

Units of account
- Symbol: 文 or M^{N}
- Superunit
- 100: jeon (錢)
- 1000: kwan (貫) / hwan (圜)

Demographics
- Date of introduction: 998 (first attempt), 1423 (second attempt), 1625 (third attempt)
- Date of withdrawal: 1892
- Replaced by: Korean yang
- User(s): Goryeo (998–1105), Joseon (1423–1425, 1625–1892)

Valuation
- Pegged with: (Korean Empire) Korean won = 500 mun (from 1908)
- This infobox shows the latest status before this currency was rendered obsolete.

- Korean mun
- Hangul: 문
- Hanja: 文
- RR: mun
- MR: mun

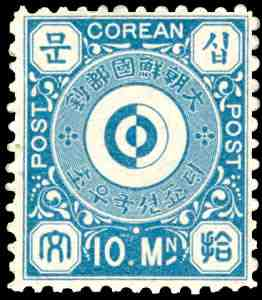
10 mun stamp of 1884, displaying abbreviation M^{N}

The mun (Korean: 문; Hanja: 文, Late Middle Chinese: 文, romanized: mjun, Middle Korean: 문, romanized: mwun) was introduced as the main currency of Korea in 1625 and stayed in use until 1892. Prior to the mun, cash coins with the inscriptions tongbo (通寶) and jungbo (重寶) and silver vases called ŭnbyŏng were used as currency in the Goryeo Dynasty (918–1392), as well as imported Chinese currency. The mun resembled and was derived from the Chinese wén (cognate also to the Japanese mon, Ryukyuan mon, and the Vietnamese văn). Coins denominated in mun were cast in copper-alloys such as brass or bronze and were round with square holes. From the 17th century until the end of the 19th century, coins denominated in mun bearing the inscription Sangpyeong Tongbo (상평통보, 常平通寶), introduced in 1633, were the most widely circulated currency. In 1888, coins were struck in small numbers denominated in mun and won (written as "warn", which were equal to 1000 mun). The mun was replaced in 1892 when the yang was introduced.

The cast coins of the mun would remain in circulation long after their abolition. They continued to be legal tender in Korea at a value of 0.1 chon (1/1000 won) until 1908, when they were revalued to 0.2 chon, or 1/500 won.

== History ==
=== Goryeo ===
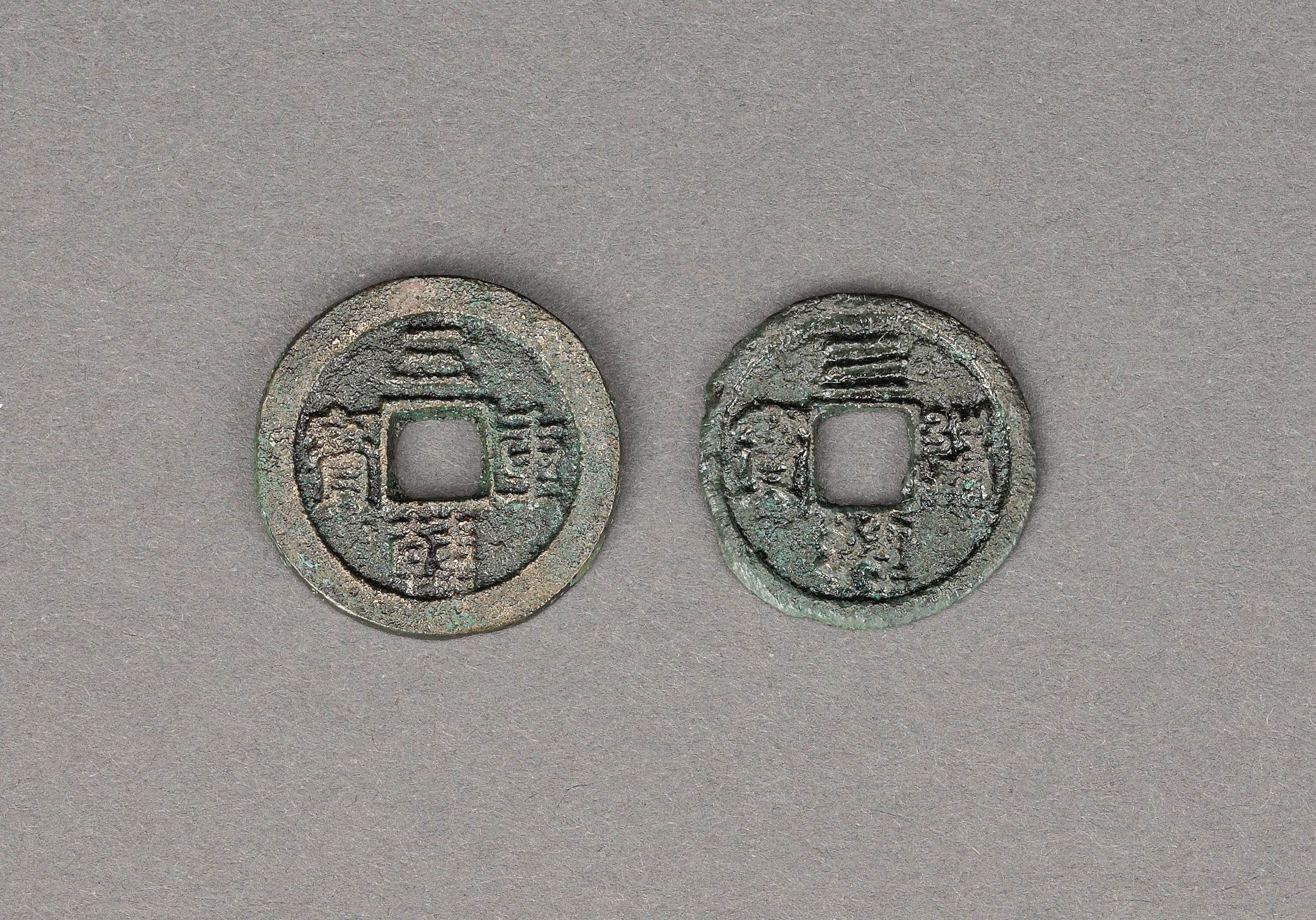
A Samhan Tongbo (三韓通寶, 삼한통보) and a Samhan Jungbo (三韓重寶, 삼한중보) inside of the National Museum of Korea, Seoul.

The first definitive record of currency use in Korea appears in the Goryeo period (918–1392). Early in that period, even though some imported Chinese currency from the Tang and Song dynasties were in circulation, commodity currency such as grain and linen continued in general circulation. In the 10th and 11th centuries, iron and bronze coins were issued, but saw limited circulation among the common people.

Around this time, the Goryeo government issued a new monetary policy regarding the minting and distribution of cash coins. This decree was implemented to both strengthen royal authority and to regulate the national finances of Korea.

King Sukjong of Goryeo created a new monetary system based on round copper-alloy coins with square holes as well as the ŭnbyŏng (銀瓶, 은병) shaped like the Korean Peninsula. The coins were produced bearing the inscriptions 東國 (동국/Dong guk or "Eastern Country"), 海東 (해동/hae dong or "East of the Sea"), and 三韓 (삼한/Samhan).

"There is nothing more important than coinage, which may benefit our country and enrich the people … It is only now that we have issued decrees about the minting of metal coinage."

— Goryeosa (History of the Goryeo Dynasty), article on money from the Sikhwaji (Treatise on Food and Money), 1102 (Year 7 of King Sukjong of Goryeo).

An extremely rare variant of the Samhan Tongbo (삼한통보, 三韓通寶) cash coin exists that bears the character 叁 written in "official script" instead of 三, of which only 2 have currently been found.

A new government department, the Directorate of the Mint was created, this government agency was in charge of regulating the newly established currency system, and the Dongguk Tongbo (東國通寶) was the first of these new Korean cash coins to be minted.

In order to strengthen the monetary policy of Goryeo, government officials were encouraged to receive their salaries in cash coins and it was hoped that if they would spend the new currency at local taverns that this would encourage their circulation to become widespread throughout Korea. However, the new cash coin's value would prove to be rather unreliable in the marketplace and it was considered to be impractical for purchasing and trading goods. Because of this perception the new cash coins of Goryeo did not find wide usage.

The ŭnbyŏng (or hwalgu) silver vases were widely used and circulated among the aristocracy. These ŭnbyŏng were produced from the year 1101 and were engraved with an official state seal to mark them as a legitimate currency which was valid throughout Goryeo. The ŭnbyŏng weighed around one Kŭn (斤, 근) which is roughly equal to 600 grams, this made them very useful for paying for large transactions. Historians suggest that the ŭnbyŏng primarily used by the aristocratic classes and that were also often involved in the bribing of government officials. In the year 1282 the government enacted a law that pegged the value of one ŭnbyŏng at between 2,700 and 3,400 litres of rice. But regardless of the fact that this currency was highly impractical for paying for low value items, the ŭnbyŏng would continue to be used during the next two centuries.

During the reign of Chungnyeol of Goryeo the government had permitted the circulation of rough or broken pieces of silver. By the year 1331 the ŭnbyŏng had completely disappeared from circulation. No specimens of the ŭnbyŏng are known to have survived to the modern era.

Inscription	Hangul	McCune–Reischauer	Revised Romanisation	Scripts	Date of casting	Diameter (in millimeter)	Weight (in grams)	Image
東國通寶	동국통보	Dong kuk T'ong Bo	Dong Guk Tong Bo	Seal script (篆書), Clerical script (隸書), Regular script (楷書), and Running script (行書)	998–1097 AD	23 ~ 25	2.4 ~ 3	
東國重寶	동국중보	Dong Kuk Chung Bo	Dong Guk Jung Bo	Regular script (楷書)	998–1097 AD	24 ~ 25	2.8 ~ 3.6 (Note: Specimens weighing as much 4.2 grams have been recorded.)	
三韓通寶	삼한통보	Sam Han T'ong Bo	Sam Han Tong Bo	Seal script (篆 書), Clerical script (隸書) and Running script (行書)	1097–1105 AD	23 ~ 25	2.6 ~ 3.4 (Note: Specimens weighing as little 2.1 grams have been recorded.)	
叁韓通寶 (Note: There is a very rare version of the Samhan Tongbo cash coin type with the Hanja character for "three" (三) written in the "official script" style of Chinese calligraphy as "叁". Only one or two authentic specimens of this type of cash coin are known to exist.)	삼한통보	Sam Han T'ong Bo	Sam Han Tong Bo	"Official Script"	1097–1105 AD			
三韓重寶	삼한중보	Sam Han Chung Bo	Sam Han Jung Bo	Regular script (楷書)	1097–1105 AD	25	4	
海東通寶	해동통보	Hae Dong T'ong Bo	Hae Dong Tong Bo	Seal script (篆書), Clerical script (隸書), Regular script (楷書), and Running script (行書)	1097–1105 AD	25	2.9	
海東重寶	해동중보	Hae Dong Chung Bo	Hae Dong Jung Bo	Regular script (楷書)	1097–1105 AD	25	3.1 ~ 4	
海東元寶 (Note: These cash coins are extremely rare and the only recent specimens of the Haedong Wonbo (海東元寶) that have been excavated were found in an area near Kaesong, North Korea.)	해동원보	Hae Dong Wŏn Bo	Hae Dong Won Bo	Regular script (楷書)	1097–1105 AD			

=== Joseon ===
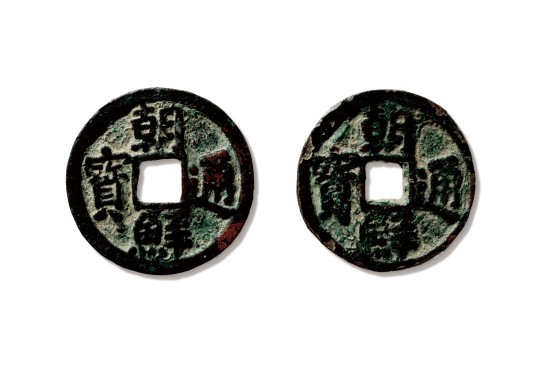
Two Joseon Tongbo (朝鮮通寶) cash coin produced between 1423 and 1425.

==== Joseon Tongbo and Shibjeon Tongbo cash coins ====
It was not until the beginning of the Joseon period (1392–1910) that copper coins were minted for wide circulation.

The Jeohwa (저화; 楮貨), which was made of standardized mulberry-bark paper (known as Korean paper) early in the Joseon period, became the first legal paper money in Korea and was used as a medium of exchange in place of coins until it disappeared in the early 16th century. Korean traders at the time also accepted the Chinese Great Ming Treasure Note banknotes. However, banknotes were almost exclusively used for the payment of taxes, and they struggled to catch on in the general Korean market. No paper money survives from this period.

During the early years of the Joseon period cloth and grains would remain the most common forms of currency among the Korean people, during this time cotton was considered to be the most important medium of exchange. The government of Joseon also recognised the prominent role that cotton played in the Korean economy and the highest quality specimens of cotton would be stamped with the text "Joseon Tongpyejiin", which could be seen as a government seal of approval and meant that it could be used as currency throughout Korea. Barter would remain the norm in Joseon society for many generations before the reintroduction of cash coinage.

Bronze coins were cast starting in 1423 during the reign of king Sejong the Great with the Joseon Tongbo (조선통보, 朝鮮通寶) cash coins. The coins produced under Sejong were pegged to copper at 160 coins to one Kŭn (斤, 근) which is equal to 600 grams, though the actual market rates regularly fluctuated. But the monetary system proved to be unpopular as people resorted back to barter after a few years.

The Sejong era Joseon Tongbo cash coins were only issued in the years 1423 (Sejong 5), 1424 (Sejong 6), and 1425 (Sejong 7) and all of these cash coins distinctively use the regular script font of Chinese characters which tended to be both clearly and distinctively inscribed while their reverse sides tend to be blank (blank reverses are known as "光背"). This first series of Joseon Tongbo are generally about 24 millimeters in diameter and tend to weigh between 3.2 and 4 grams. These cash coins were modeled after the Chinese Tang dynasty era Kaiyuan Tongbao (開元通寶, Gaewon Tongbo) cash coins.

The Kings of Joseon were consistently creating new legislation aimed at promoting coins and promoted their manufacture to be widely used. Through these measures, the monarchs hoped to dispel the general mistrust that the Korean people had towards coinage and they also hoped that these decrees would boost the value of Korean cash coins.

Following the Japanese invasions of Korea it had become more necessary for there to be circulating coinage in Korea, this was needed in order to both procure military supplies and secure the national finances.

In 1625 under the reign of king Injo of Joseon a new series of cash coins with the same inscription as under Sejong the Great were minted. In order to promote the circulation of the new coinage, King Injo tried to rent out vacant rooms for the opening of new restaurants which would accept these cash coins, these rooms were situated in front of Gyeongbok Palace. This was an attempt to encourage the circulation of the new coinage and the King hoped to open the eyes of the Korean people to the value of using coinage over barter.

"The street in front of Gyeongbokgung Palace would make an ideal place for restaurants. I would like to gather people to manage restaurants there. I believe those restaurants will help deal with the thirsty and hungry."

— Injo Sillok (Annals of King Injo), June 18, 1626 (Year 4 of King Injo of Joseon)

The government soon enacted new national laws to stimulate the usage of coinage, for instance a law that allowed for people to pay their taxes using coins. Government officials were now also required to use cash coins to pay for their expenses when they would travel as a means to help promote their circulation. Another factor that led to the more widely adoption of coinage by the Korean people this time around was the fact seasonal problems such as droughts or less productive harvests made it more difficult to manufacture grains and cloth causing them to decrease in circulation.

The second series of the Joseon Tongbo came roughly two centuries after the first and the first issues were made in the year 1625 (Injo 3), these cash coins had their inscriptions written in "official style" script or palbun (八分, "eight part (script)"). During this era the government wasn't the only manufacturer as private minting was allowed to take place and as such these cash coins tend to be very diverse.

The second series of Joseon Tongbo cash coins tend to have a rather yellow-brown colour and the Hanja characters depicted on them were not very standardised. The character strokes can be either thin or thick and either small or large. Some varieties of this series have broad rims while others tend to have very narrow rims. Unlike with the first series of the Joseon Tongbo cash coins, Joseon Tongbo cash coins with inscriptions written using the clerical script (隸書) typeface are much more scarce.

In the year 1651, King Hyojong issued a royal decree which ordered the people of Joseon to use the Joseon Tongbo cash coins and it also prohibited the usage of cloth as a currency. During this era the private production of cash coins was also allowed.

A sudden and major increase in agricultural production during the reign of King Sukjong paved the way for the opening of about 1,000 markets across Korea, this led to the development of commerce and industry in the country which in turn gave a more favourable market for the circulation of coinage. The brisk production of goods to be traded and the subsequent development of commerce led to there being a relatively stable currency system during this era. These new markets and the merchants that they brought with them substantially raised the importance of currency, cash coins were now highly valued due to their ease of transportation and storage.

This second series of Joseon Tongbo coins became the inspiration for the following Sangpyeong Tongbo series, though later these coins would be suspended due to the Later Jin, and the Qing invasions of Joseon. After those wars Korea would become dependent on importing copper from Japan in order to sustain the production of coinage.

A number of different 10 mun and 1 jeon versions of the Joseon Tongbo cash coins were also created around the year 1881, these cash coins were experimental and therefore quite rare and not many contemporary records were written about them. These cash coins tend to have a diameter of 45 millimetres and tend to weigh around 30 grams and according to some reports they were 48.2 millimetres in diameter and had a weight of 29 grams. Some of them have blank reverse sides, these can be found in two different types which is dependent on whether the Chinese characters on the obverse side are written in a "small script" (小字) or a "large script" (大字), while others have the Hanja character "十" (십, "ten") located right above the square centre hole on the back.

The Joseon Tongbo cash coins with the denomination of 1 jeon were also only minted as an experimental issue and tend to have the mint mark of the Joseon Treasury Department on their reverse right above the square centre hole, this character was usually depicted as "戸", but can also sometimes be found as "户". On the right side of the square centre hole were the Chinese characters "一錢" (일전, il jeon), indicating its nominal value. The 1 jeon Joseon Tongbo cash coins was possibly 47.6 millimeters in diameter and allegedly had a weight of 31 grams.

During the time when the 1 jeon Joseon Tongbo cash coins were issued 400 mun (or 400 small cash coins of 1 mun) were valued as being worth 1 tael (兩, 양 or 냥) of silver. So in the new system planned for these Joseon Tongbo cash coins one coin of 1 jeon would have been worth forty coins of 10 mun and were themselves 1/10 of a tael.

Other variants of the 1 jeon Joseon Tongbo cash coins can have some slight variations in the method that the "head" (or top part) of the Chinese character Tong (通) is written. Furthermore, there can be variations in how the Chinese character Seon (鮮) is written as well, there can be slight differences in the way that the 4 bottom strokes (or "dots") of the "魚" are written as well as the method that the top part (or "head") of the "羊" is inscribed.

Another cash coin attributed to this period is the Shibjeon Tongbo (십전통보, 十錢通寶), which has been attributed by some numismatists to private mints during the reign of King Hyojong around the year 1651, while other numismatists think that the Shibjeon Tongbo cash coins may have been cast starting in 1793 under King Jeongjo. It is generally believed that the Shibjeon Tongbo is a series of privately issued cash coins which is supported by the extreme diversity between specimens.

Inscription	Hangul	McCune–Reischauer	Revised Romanisation	Date of introduction	Scripts	Diameter (in millimeter)	Weight (in grams)	Image
朝鮮通寶	조선통보	Chosŏn T'ong Bo	Joseon Tong Bo	1423 (first attempt), 1625 (second attempt)	Regular script (楷書) (Note: The Joseon Tongbo cash coins produced under the reign of King Sejong used regular script.) "official style" (八分) (Note: Korean: palbun, this font was used during the reign of King Injo.)	24 ~ 24.5 (1 mun); 45 (10 mun)	3.2 ~ 4 (1 mun); 30 (10 mun)	
十錢通寶	십전통보	Sip Chŏn T'ong Bo	Shib Jeon Tong Bo	1651 or 1793	Various	28 ~ 40		

==== Sangpyeong Tongbo cash coins ====
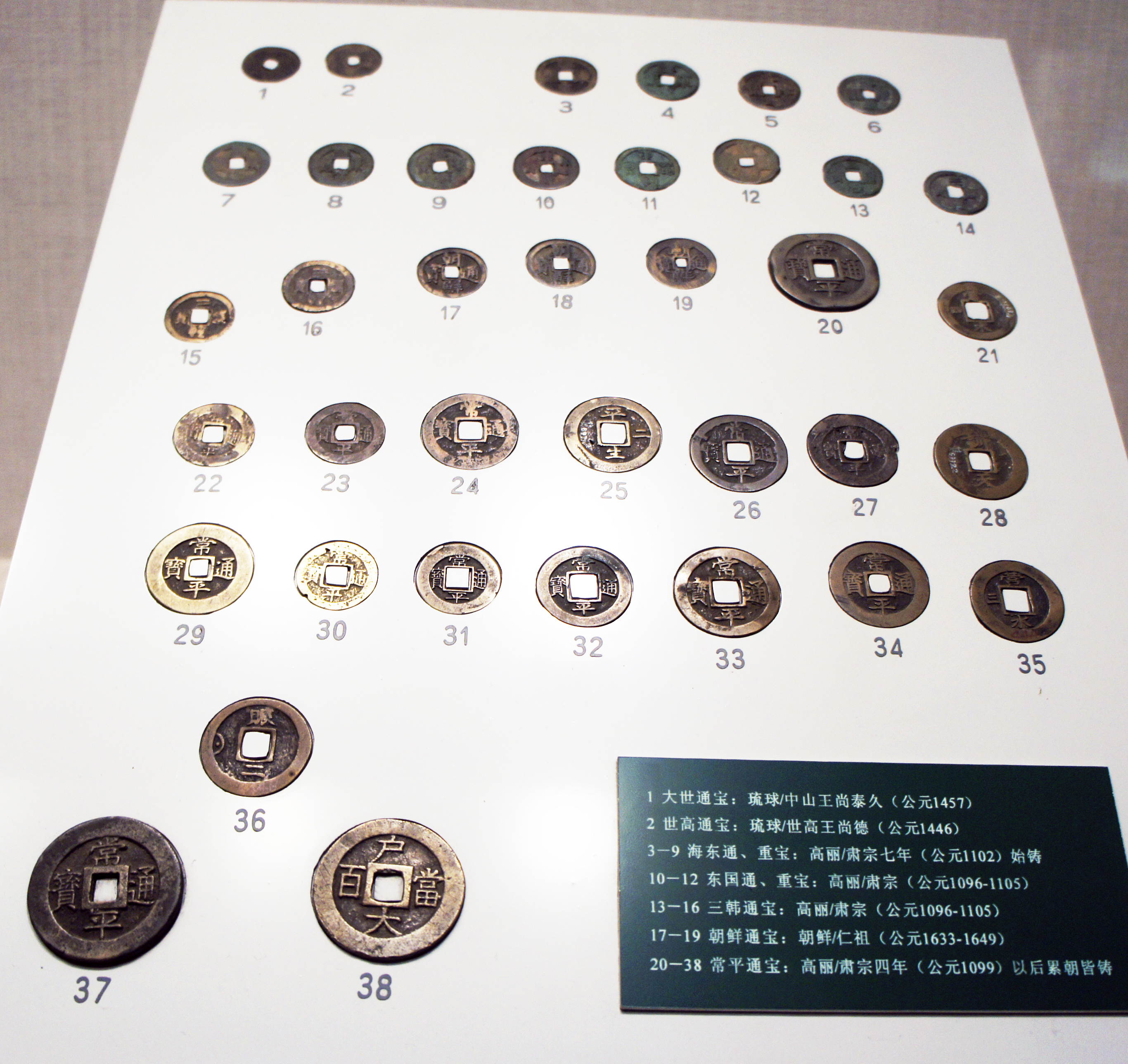
Various coins from Goryeo, and Joseon with mostly different Sangpyeong Tongbo from small to large denominations. Note that some of the coins at the top are Ryukyuan mon coins.

Coins issued by a government famine relief organisation named the "Stabilisation Office" (Sangpyeongchong 상평청, 常平廳) were introduced in 1633, the coins bear an abbreviation of the office's name with the phrase Tongbo (통보/"通寶" or circulating treasure) together formulating the inscription Sangpyeong Tongbo (상평통보, 常平通寶) which could be interpreted as "always even currency" and these first coins issued by the Sangpyeongchong had blank reverse sides. The round shape of the cash coin represented the sky, and a square hole situated in the middle coin represented the earth. The Sangpyeongchong served as a grain warehouse agency that would stockpile grain in years where the harvest was good, then in the years with less successful harvests the Sangpyeongchong would be able to distribute the stockpiled grains to prevent a major famine.

The adoption of the Sangpyeong Tongbo was slow, this was because the Korean economy didn't have much need for coinage in "commercial" quantities. The Sangpyeong Tongbo were cast in a wide range of weights, nominal values, as well as in various copper-alloys. These new coins started to circulate all over Joseon in 1678 during the reign of king Sukjong of Joseon.

Unlike earlier minted coins from the Georyo period, no mun currency produced under the Joseon dynasty bore the inscription Wonbo (元寶, 원보) on any large denomination because a Chinese naming taboo where the character "元" (Hangul: 원) may not be used as it was a part of Hongwu's original name, the founding emperor of the Ming Dynasty, of which Joseon was a tributary state. For this reason, all 100 mun coins also bear the inscription of "常平通寶", giving every coin from this period exactly the same obverse.

As the Sangpyeong Tongbo achieved nationwide circulation, it had now become more possible for people to accumulate wealth.

Cash coins were manufactured using a special casting technique where a Mother coin (母錢, 모전), or seed coin, was used that allowed for all coins in the same series to resemble each other with very little disparities between them. The mother coin was initially prepared by engraving a pattern with the legend of the cash coin which had to be manufactured. In the manufacturing process mother coins were used to impress the design in moulds which were made from easily worked metals such as tin and these moulds were then placed in a rectangular frame made from pear wood filled with fine wet sand, possibly mixed with clay, and enhanced with either charcoal or coal dust to allow for the molten metal to smoothly flow through, this frame would act as a layer that separates the two parts of the coin moulds. The mother coin was recovered by the people who cast the coins and was placed on top of the second frame and the aforementioned process was repeated until fifteen layers of moulds had formed based on this single mother coin. After cooling down a "coin tree" (錢樹, 전수) or long metallic stick with the freshly minted cash coins attached in the shape of "branches" would be extracted from the mould and these coins could be broken off and if necessary had their square holes chiseled clean, after this the coins were placed on a long metal rod to simultaneously remove the rough edges for hundreds of coins and then these cash coins could be strung together and enter circulation. Because of the way that the Sangpyeong Tongbo cash coins looked likes the leaves of a tree branch during this process, they were known as yeopjeon (葉錢) which could be translated as "leaf coin".

The widespread success of the Sangpyeong Tongbo cash coins also brought about many social changes to Korean society. One of these changes was the emergence of byeoljeon, these were non-monetary decorative objects that reflected on the desire of people to gain more wealth.

Between the years 1742 and 1752 great quantities of dangijeon (2 mun) Sangpyeong Tongbo cash coins were cast that contained a character from the Thousand Character Classic or various other types of symbols and words at the bottom of their reverse sides. Many of these dangijeon cash coins also had a number, circle, or crescent on the left of right sides of the square centre hole. It is currently not known if these symbols represented furnace numbers, series, casting periods, months, years, or if these symbols were just added for every new batch of mother coins.

1 tael of Sangpyeong Tongbo cash coins could purchase 20 kilograms of rice, and 4 taels Sangpyeong Tongbo cash coins could purchase either 80 kilograms of rice or 1 tael of silver. 1 piece, or 1 pun (分, 푼), would be worth 200 ~ 300 South Korean won in 2019 (or $0.16 ~ 0.25). The generally low value of small denomination Sangpyeong Tongbo cash coins is also the origin of the common Korean phrase "Give me one pun!", which is used to figuratively refer to the price of a cheap item. In his 1888 book Life in Corea William Richard Charles stated that the value of a 1 mun Sangpyeong Tongbo cash coin was comparable to that of a farthing, a coin worth 1/960 pound sterling.

Most Sangpyeong Tongbo cash coins tend to be cast of high quality and have a yellowish colour and very clearly written Chinese characters, these were usually produced earlier at one of the 52 government mints, while later less refined Sangpyeong Tongbo cash coins with rather crude appearances with a blackish colour and less well defined Chinese characters tend to be later made privately issues versions.

==== Variants and denominations of the Sangpyeong Tongbo ====
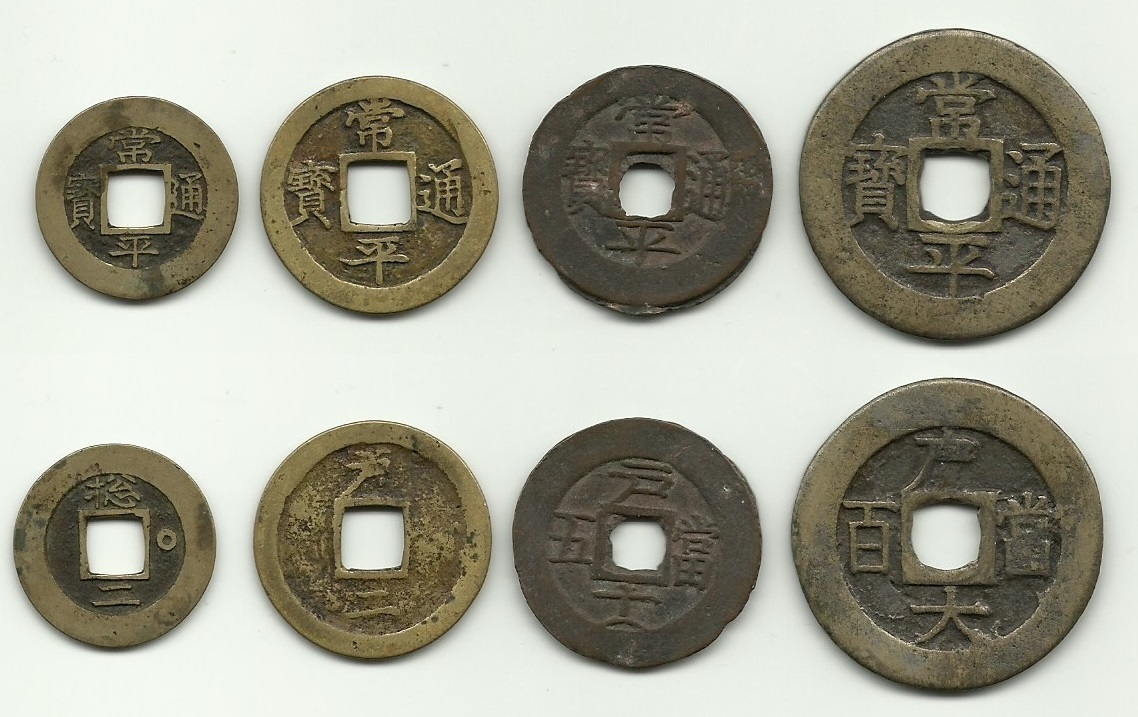
All denominations of the Sangpyeong Tongbo (常平通寶) series of cash coins. From left to right the Dangiljeon (當一錢), Dangijeon (當二錢), dangojeon (當五錢), and Dangbaekjeon (當百錢).

The most common Sangpyeong Tongbo cash coins were the 1 mun variants, but quite early 2 mun variants were also being cast, the earliest 2 mun cash coins had the Chinese character "二" (이) on their reverses, but later versions of the 2 mun cash coins can only be distinguished by the fact that they were physically larger than the 1 mun cash coins.

The denominations of the Sangpyeong Tongbo cash coins were known as the Dangiljeon (當一錢), Dangijeon (當二錢), dangojeon (當五錢), and Dangbaekjeon (當百錢) based on their value.

As records were not actively kept it is currently unknown how many different variants of the Sangpyeong Tongbo cash coins were cast, and how much of each respective denomination (with the notable exception of the 100 mun coin, of which a total of 1,784,038 were minted).

There are 3,078 varieties of the 1, 2, and 5 mun denominations, and 48 varieties of the 100 mun denomination documented by the authoritative Korean coin catalogue (Hanja: 高麗朝鮮時代貨幣; Hangul: 고여조선시대화폐), while there are estimated more than 5,000 different variants of the Sangpyeong Tongbo coins cast in the history of its production spanning 258 years, with many variants of the series still undocumented.

According to the numismatist Alan D. Craig the Bank of Korea once had 3,137 different variants of the Sangpyeong Tongbo cash coins in its collection.

Denomination	Hanja	Hangul	Diameter (in millimeter)	Dates	Notes	Obverse image	Reverse image
1 mun	一文	일문	24–25	1633			
2 mun	二文	이문	27–29	1679	The earliest versions had the Chinese character "二" (이) on their reverse sides, but later versions can only be distinguished by the fact that they were physically larger than the 1 mun cash coins.		
5 mun	五文	오문	31–33	1883	Contains the inscription "當五", which is why they are known as "當五錢" (당오전).		
100 mun	百文	백문	40.6	12 December 1866 (Date of first mint by the Treasury Department of the Joseon government.); 15 January 1867 (Date that circulation among the general populace began.); 16 June 1867 (Date that the production of these coins by the government of Joseon had ceased.)	100 mun coins are the only accurately documented denomination of which records exist. All of the government produced 100 mun coins always had a thickness of 2.8 millimeter and a weight of 25.1 grams. These coins were produced a total of 172 days from the date of first production to their discontinuation.		

==== 100 mun coin and inflation ====
The 100 mun denomination (Dangbeakjeon or Tangbeakjeon, 當百錢/당백전) was introduced in 1866 by regent Heungseon Daewongun to finance the state's military expenditures to strengthen Korea's military power. This was to compete with that of the Western powers which were forming an ever growing threat, as well as to rebuild the Gyeongbok Palace.

After its introduction, the mun started to suffer from inflation. This was because the intrinsic value of the 100 mun coin was only five to six times as much as 5 mun coins, leading to the consumer price of e.g. rice to expand sixfold within 2 years. This eventually lead to traders preferring silver foreign currency such as the Mexican peso, Japanese yen, Russian ruble, and Chinese sycees. As a result, some people started to melt smaller Sangpyeong Tongbo cash coins down to make counterfeit money. People who had older, lower denomination Sangpyeong Tongbo avoided exchanging them with the newer 100 mun coins and withheld their Sangpyeong Tongbo from the market. The new 100 mun series would be discontinued in April 1867 after being produced only for 172 days. Despite no longer being produced, the government of Joseon continued distributing them into Korean markets until an appeal from Choe Ik-hyeon convinced the government that these coins had an adverse effect on every class of Korean society.

The introduction of the 100 mun coin happened concurrent with the Tenpō Tsūhō 100 mon coin issued by the Tokugawa shogunate in 1835 (in reaction to government deficit), the 100 wén coin by the Qing dynasty in 1853 (in reaction to the Taiping Rebellion), the Ryukyuan 100 mon and half Shu cash coins, and the large denomination Tự Đức Bảo Sao cash coins in Vietnam. All of these large denomination cash coins also caused inflation on comparable levels.

==== Introduction of Qing dynasty cash coins ====
Following the prohibition of the circulation of the Dangbaekjeon cash coins the government started receiving huge losses. Hence, to secure another source of revenue and to cover its losses, the Joseon government legalise the use of Qing Chinese money in Korea in June 1867, these Chinese cash coins were smuggled into by Korean interpreters of Mandarin Chinese. Among the Qing dynasty cash coin inscriptions it imported were the Jiaqing Tongbao (嘉慶通寶), Daoguang Tongbao (道光通寶), and Tongzhi Tongbao (同治通寶) and these would officially circulate in Korea at par with the native Sangpyeong Tongbo cash coins, this was despite the fact that these Qing dynasty cash coins only had around 1/3 of the intrinsic value of Sangpyeong Tongbo cash coins.

In the 11th year of the reign of King Gojong (1874), in January of that year that Joseon banned the circulation of Chinese cash coins within their borders, since the Chinese money accelerated price hikes just as the Dae Dong Jeon would later have. The total amount of Chinese cash coins in circulation at the time amounted to three or four million yang. This was as much as 3/10 or 4/10 of the outstanding Sangpyeong Tongbo cash coins.

This sudden contraction of the volume of money in circulation caused an economic depression and led to a rise in unemployment.

=== 5 mun coin and subsequent issues ===
The Korean government introduced the Dangojeon (當五錢, 당오전, alternatively Romanised as Tangojeon) in 1883, like the earlier Dangbaekjeon and legalisation of Qing Chinese money this denomination also caused a sharp decline in the value of coinage which brought a lot of turmoil to the Korean economy. The Dangojeon cash coins were only slightly larger than "value two" Sangpyeong Tongbo cash coins. The introduction of this denomination also brought about a rise in the prices of various commodities such as cotton cloth and rice.

The effects that the Dangojeon had caused were not as bad as those that were caused by the gross overvaluing of the Danbaekjeon cash coins, but the effects were nevertheless not beneficial for both the Korean economy and the Korean currency system. Both the Danbaekjeon and the Dangojeon cash coins were symptoms of the considerable turmoil that were occurring within the royal family and its advisers during the reign of King Gojong. From this point onwards, Japanese currency began to flood the Korean market and the Korean mun began to lose its power.

After King Gojong established the Jeonwanguk mint in 1883 in Incheon in order to adopt a currency more akin to international standards leading the copper Sangpyeong Tongbo coins to eventually be phased out in favour of the silver yang following the adoption of the silver standard.

== Mint marks ==
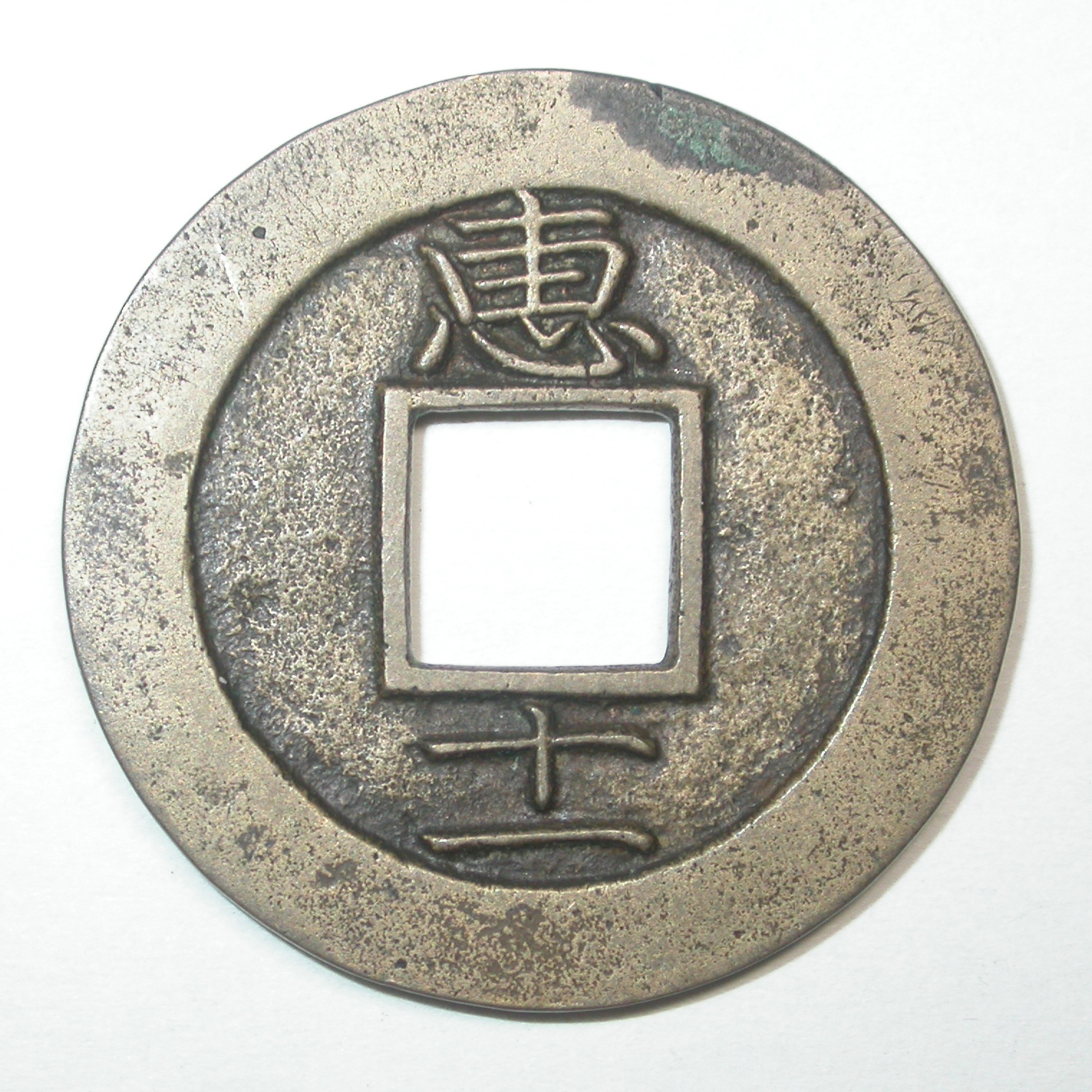
A coin issued by the Rice and Cloth Department (宣惠廳) containing the mint mark "惠".

Originally the Stabilization Office or the Sangpyeongchŏng (상평청, 常平廳) was the first agency to mint Sangpyeong Tongbo coins in 1633, and eventually various other government agencies (including military offices, and the Six Ministries of Joseon) began to produce these coins which contained various mint marks to establish their origin. At the time the mun was replaced by the yang in 1892 there had been 52 government mints in operation producing mun coins locally.

Mint mark	Hangul	Name of the agency in Hanja	Name of the agency in Hangul	Romanised	Name in English	Year introduced	Image
戸 or 户 or 戶	호	戶曹	호조	Hojo	Treasury Department	1678	
工	공	工曹	공조	Kongjo	Ministry of Industry	1685	
均	균	均役廳	균역청	Kyunyokchong	Government Tithe Office	1807	
司	사	司仆寺	사부사	Kyong Saboksi	Bureau of Royal Transportation	1678	
賑	진	賑恤廳	진휼청	Chinhyulchong	Charity Office in Seoul	1742	
向	향	粮餉廳	량향청	Yanghyangchong	Food Supply Office	1742	
宣	선	宣惠廳	선혜청	Sonhyechong	Rice and Cloth Department	1742	
惠	혜	宣惠廳	선혜청	Sonhyechong	Rice and Cloth Department	1806	
典	전	典圜局	전원국	Chonhwanguk	Central Government Mint	1833	
兵	병	兵曹	병조	Pyongjo	Ministry of Military Affairs	1742	
備 or 俻	비	備邊司	비변사	Pibyonsa	National Defense Bureau	1742	
捻	염	捻戎廳	염융청	Chongyungchong	General Military Office	1692	
营 or 營	영	御营廳	어영청	Oyongchong	Special Army Unit	1678	
武 (1)	무 (1)	武備司	무비사	Mubisa	Armaments Bureau	1742	
武 (2)	무 (2)	武衛營	무위영	Muwiyong	Guard Office at the Palace	1742	
禁	금	禁衛營	금위영	Kumwiyong	Court Guard Military Unit	1742	
訓	훈	訓練都監	훈연도감	Hullyondogam	Military Training Command	1678	
抄	초	精抄廳	정초청	Chongchochong	Commando Military Unit	1678	
統 (1)	통 (1)	統營	통영	Tongyŏng	Tongyeong Naval Office	1727	
統 (2)	통 (2)	統衛營	통위영	Tongwiyong	Military Office in Seoul	1727	
經	경	經理廳	경리청	Kyŏngnichong	Government Office of Pukhan Mountain Fortress	1830	
守	수	守御廳	수어청	Suochong	Seoul Defense Fort	1742	
沁	심	沁華管理	심화관이	Sim Kanghwa Kwalliyong	Kanghwa Township Military Office	1883	
開	개	開城管理營	개성관이영	Kaesong Kwalliyong	Kaesong Township Military Office	1678	
松	송	開城管理營	개성관이영	Kaesong Kwalliyong	(Song) Kaesong Township Military Office	1882	
利	리	利原管理營	리원관이영	Iwon Kwalliyong	Iwon Township Military Office	1882	
水	수	水原管理營	수원관이영	Suwon Kalliyong	Suwon Township Military Office	1727	
原	원	原州管理營	원주관이영	Wonju Kwalliyong	Wonju Township Military Office	1678	
海	해	海州管理營	해주관이영	Haeju Kwalliyong	Haeju Township Military Office	1742	
春	춘	春川管理營	춘천관이영	Ch'unch'on Kwalliyong	Ch'unch'on Township Military Office	1888	
川	천	端川管理營	단천관이영	Tanch'on Kwalliyong	Tanch'on Township Military Office	1883	
昌 (1)	창 (1)	昌德宮	창덕궁	Ch'angdŏk Kung	Ch'angdŏk Palace Mint	1864	
昌 (2)	창 (2)	昌原管理營	창원관이영	Ch'angwon Kwalliyong	Ch'angwon Township Military Office	1864	
圻	기	廣州管理營	광주관이영	Kwangju Kwalliyong	Kwangju Township Military Office in Kyonggi Province	1742	
京	경	京畿監營	경기감영	Kyŏnggi Kamyong	Kyŏnggi Provincial Office	1742	
京 水	경수	京畿水營	경기수영	Kyŏnggi Suyong	Kyŏnggi Naval Station	1742	
黃	황	黃海監營	황해감영	Hwanghae Kamyong	Hwanghae Provincial Office	1742	
平	평	平安監營	평안감영	P'yŏngan Kamyong	P'yŏngan Provincial Office	1678	
平 兵	평병	平安兵營	평안병영	P'yŏngan Pyongyong	P'yŏngan Military Fort	1678	
咸	함	咸鏡監營	함경감영	Hamgyong Kamyong	Hamyong Provincial Office	1742	
咸 北	함북	咸鏡北營	함경북영	Hamgyong Pugyong	North Hamyong Provincial Office	1742	
咸 南	함남	咸鏡南營	함경남영	Hamgyong Namyong	South Hamyong Provincial Office	1742	
江	강	江原監營	강원감영	Kangwon Kamyong	Kangwon Provincial Office	1742	
尚	상	慶尚監營	경상감영	Kyongsang Kamyong	Kyongsang Provincial Office	1695	
尚 水	상수	慶尚水營	경상수영	Kyongsang Suyong	Kyongsang Naval Station	1695	
尚 右	상우	慶尚右營	경상우영	Kyongsang Uyong	Kyongsang Right Naval Base	1695	
尚 左	상좌	慶尚左營	경상좌영	Kyongsang Chwayong	Kyongsang Left Naval Base	1695	
全	전	全羅監營	전라감영	Chŏlla Kamyong	Chŏlla Provincial Office	1682	
全 兵	전병	全羅兵營	전라병영	Chŏlla Pyongyong	Chŏlla Military Fort	1678	
全 右	전우	全羅右營	전라우영	Chŏlla Uyong	Chŏlla Right Naval Base	1678	
全 左	전좌	全羅左營	전라좌영	Chŏlla Chwayong	Chŏlla Left Naval Base	1678	
忠	충	忠清監營	충청감영	Ch'ungch'ŏng Kamyong	Ch'ungch'ŏng Provincial Office	1742	

== Other symbols, numbers, and special characters used on Sangpyeong Tongbo cash coins ==
Various other symbols to identify specific coins were also used such as the Thousand Character Classic, "furnace" and "series" numbers, as the Five Elements, astronomical symbols, the Eight Trigrams, the Ten Celestial Stems, the Twelve Terrestrial Branches, as well as a variety of characters with an unknown purpose. Mint marks were placed above the square hole on the reverse site, while furnace markings and other Chinese characters were placed below, special symbols such as dots, circles, crescents, horizontal lines, and vertical lines generally appeared either left or right of the square hole.

With the notable exception of the coins produced by the Government Office of Pukhan Mountain Fortress which bears the character "Kyŏng" (經/경) written in Running script, all Hanja characters on both sides of every Sangpyeong Tongbo cash coin are written in regular script. Though the character "通" (통) only contains one dot which is a characteristic of Clerical script as Regular script versions usually have 2 dots.

=== Numbers, Stars, Suns, and Man ===
In the year 1742 special characters began appearing on the reverse sides of some Sangpyeong Tongbo cash coins, many of these special characters were used to indicate which furnace had been used to produce them or to which "series" they belonged. The series number may be to the left, right, or at the bottom of the center hole of the coin. The furnace designator may be either a numeral or a character from the Thousand Character Classic.

While most of these were Hanja characters, some also had dots, circles, crescents, and horizontal lines which were used to represent things like the stars (星), the sun (日), the moon (月), and man (人).

Symbol	Date of introduction	Image
"Star" (dot)	1742	
"Sun" (circle)	1742	
"Moon" (crescent)	1742	
"Man" (vertical line)	1742	

=== Thousand Character Classic ===
Some Sangpyeong Tongbo cash coins contained characters from the Thousand Character Classic (千字文, Ch'ŏnjamun) to determine by which furnace they were cast, the Thousand Character Classic was used in the Far East for teaching Chinese characters and was a large poem which consisted of 250 phrases with each one of these phrases being only composed 4 Hanja characters. The entire Thousand Character Classic is composed of 1000 Chinese characters and no point is a single character repeated.

From the year 1742 the first 44 characters of the Thousand Character Classic began being used on some Sangpyeong Tongbo cash coins to indicate furnace number, while some Sangpyeong Tongbo cash coins used Chinese numerals specifically for this purpose, others used this system because of the non-repetitive nature of the Thousand Character Classic it is often used as a numbering system for the numbers 1 to 1000. The characters of the Thousand Character Classic were usually placed at the bottom (often right below the square centre hole) on the reverse side of the Sangpyeong Tongbo cash coins.

Character (Hanja)	Character (Hangul)	Date of introduction	Image
天	천	1742	
地	지	1742	
玄	현	1742	
黄	황	1742	
宇	우	1742	
宙	주	1742	
洪	홍	1742	
荒	황	1742	
日	일	1742	
月	월	1742	
盈	영	1742	
昃	측	1742	
辰	신 / 진	1742	
宿	수 / 숙	1742	
列	렬 / 열	1742	
張	장	1742	
寒	한	1742	
来	래	1742	
暑	서	1742	
往	왕	1742	
秋	추	1742	
收	수	1742	
冬	동	1742	
藏	장	1742	
閏	윤	1742	
餘	여	1742	
成	성	1742	
歲	세	1742	
律	률 / 율	1742	
吕	려	1742	
調	조 / 주	1742	
陽	양	1742	
雲	운	1742	
騰	등	1742	
致	치	1742	
雨	우	1742	
露	노 / 로	1742	
結	결	1742	
為	위	1742	
霜	상	1742	
金	금 / 김	1742	
生	생	1742	
麗	려 / 여	1742	
水	수	1742	

=== The Five Elements ===
Some Sangpyeong Tongbo cash coins used the five elements (오행) to indicate furnace numbers or "series" number.

Character (Hanja)	Character (Hangul)	Korean name	English	Year of introduction	Image
金	금	Kum	Metal	1752	
木	목	Mok	Wood	1752	
水	수	Su	Water	1752	
火	화	Hwa	Fire	1752	
土	토	T'o	Earth	1752	

=== The Ten Celestial Stems ===
The Ten Celestial Stems (천간) were used as another "numbering" system for Sangpyeong Tongbo cash coins for furnace or "series" numbers.

Symbol (Hanja)	Symbol (Hangul)	Korean name	Represented number	Image
甲	갑	Gap	One	
乙	을	Eul	Two	
丙	병	Byeong	Three	
丁	정	Jeong	Four	
戊	무	Mu	Five	
己	기	Gi	Six	
庚	경	Gyeong	Seven	
辛	신	Sin	Eight	
壬	임	Im	Nine	
癸	계	Gye	Ten	

=== The Twelve Terrestrial Branches ===
Like how the Ten Celestial Stems are used for numbering Sangpyeong Tongbo cash coins, the Twelve Terrestrial Branches (지지, or "Twelve Earthly Branches"), another system used in the traditional Chinese calendar's Sexagenary cycle (육십갑자), was used to indicate furnace or "series" numbers.

Character (Hanja)	Character (Hangul)	Korean (RR)	Represented number	Image
子	자	Ja	One	
丑	축	Ch'uk	Two	
寅	인	In	Three	
卯	묘	Myo	Four	
辰	진	Jin	Five	
巳	사	Sa	Six	
午	오	O	Seven	
未	미	Mi	Eight	
申	신	Sin	Nine	
酉	유	Yu	Ten	
戌	술	Sul	Eleven	
亥	해	Hae	Twelve	

=== Cash coins with the character "☳" ===
A small number of 2 mun Sangpyeong Tongbo cash coins (當二錢, dangijeon, "Value Two (Coins)") manufactured by the T'ongyong Naval Office with the Eight Trigrams (팔괘) character on them. The character "☳" ("Thunder") was written on their reverses as well as a number of other Hanja characters.

Character	Hanja / Hangul	Korean (RR)	Meaning	Image
☳	震 / 진	Jin	Thunder	

=== Miscellaneous characters ===
There are also a vast number of miscellaneous Hanja characters found on the reverse side of Sangpyeong Tongbo cash coins of which their meaning or what they represent is currently not known.

Some of these Chinese characters include:

Character (Hanja)	Character (Hangul)	Korean (RR)	English	Image
入	입	Ip	Enter	
大	대	Tae	Big, Large	
工	공	Kong	Work	
千	천	Chon	Thousand	
文	문	Mun	Cash coin	
元	원	Won	The first, Round	
天	천	Chon	Heaven	
中	중	Chung	Middle, Centre	
正	정	Chong	Upright	
生	생	Saeng	Produce	
光	광	Kwang	Light	
全	전	Chon	Complete	
吉	길	Kil	Auspicious	
完	완	Wan	Finish, Whole, Complete	

== Machine-struck coinage ==
During the 1880s and 1890s the Korean government had experimented with several holed machine-struck coin designs, it is unknown if some of these coins entered circulation.

While it would be in the year 1892 that the over 250 year production of the Sangpyeong Tongbo series of cash coins would come to an end, a decade earlier in 1882 (or Gojong 19), the Korean government had experimented with creating machine-struck coinage based on Western designs and design patterns. The first issues were made from silver and lacked the iconic square centre hole designs of earlier and contemporary Korean coinages.

=== Machine-struck Sangpyeong Tongbo cash coins ===
During this period the Central Government Mint (典圜局, 전원국) created a machine-struck brass Sangpyeong Tongbo cash coin with a round centre hole.

At least three different sets of dies were cut for machine-struck 5 mun Sangpyeong Tongbo cash coins, these designs resembled the 1883 issue 5 mun cast yeopjeon versions of the coins. Only one of these three sets is known to have actually been engraved. In the year 1891 the chief engraver of the Osaka Mint in Japan, Masuda, created this design. Only one of these three designs ever saw (very limited) circulation.

As the Mint's machinery was not well suited for punching centre holes in coins the old-style designs were eventually dropped.

Machine-struck Sangpyeong Tongbo (常平通寶) cash coins
Obverse image	Reverse image	Value	Technical parameters				Description			Years of production
Obverse image	Reverse image	Value	Diameter	Thickness	Mass	Composition	Edge	Obverse	Reverse	Years of production
		5 mun	mm		grams	Brass	Plain/Smooth	常平通寶	典一當五	1884

=== Dae Dong coins ===
When Korea opened up its port cities to trade with Japanese businessmen following the Japan–Korea Treaty of 1876, it became apparent that the small denomination Sangpyeong Tongbo cash coins were not convenient at all for doing business which require larger transactions to take place, this inspired the creation of a new series of coinage made from silver. During this period Japanese influence became more intrusive into Korean society.

All of these coins had the characters "大東" (대동, dae dong, literally translated as "the Great East" which was one of the alternative names of Korea) in their obverse inscriptions. All of these new milled coins were manufactured by the Treasury Department Mint (戶曹局, 호조국), this mint was also responsible for the manufacture of Sangpyeong Tongbo cash coins. A major difference being that the "戶" (호) mint mark on the milled coinage was located in the middle of a circle, this circle itself was situated in the centre of the reverse side of the coin and was surrounded by coloured enamel (which was coloured either blue, green, or black). Specimens without the coloured cloisonné are valued at about one half the normal valuations of the coloured Dae Dong coins. There are many types of trial sets of 1, 2, and 3 jeon in existence.

List of Dae Dong coins:

Silver Dae Dong coins
Obverse image	Reverse image	Value	Technical parameters				Description			Years of production
Obverse image	Reverse image	Value	Diameter	Thickness	Mass	Composition	Edge	Obverse	Reverse	Years of production
		1 jeon	20 ~ 22 mm		3.4–3.7 grams	Silver	Plain/Smooth	大東一錢 (대동일전, "Dae Dong 1 jeon")	戶 (호, "household"), "Ho" in green, black, or blue cloisonné enameled center circle.	1882–1883
		2 jeon	27 ~ 28 mm		7.1–7.7 grams	Silver	Plain/Smooth	大東二錢 (대동이전, "Dae Dong 2 jeon")	戶 (호, "household"), "Ho" in green, black, or blue cloisonné enameled center circle.	1882–1883
		3 jeon	32.5 ~ 33 mm		10.6 grams	Silver	Plain/Smooth	大東三錢 (대동삼전, "Dae Dong 3 jeon")	戶 (호, "household"), "Ho" in green, black, or blue cloisonné enameled center circle.	1882–1883

Other than the overall design patterns there are multiple varieties of the 3 jeon (錢, 전) coin, these include variants based on character sizes (large character, medium character, and small character). The Dae Dong coins were seen as only a stopgap issue until more Westernised coinage could be produced.

These new machine-struck coins did not manage to stabilise the Korean monetary system, this was due to the rising price of silver as well as the high cost of acquiring the machines necessary for their production and the production process itself. It became a huge issue when the yangban nobility started hoarding these coins for export at a profit, where they were melted and recast as "horse hoof silver" (馬蹄銀) ingots. Because of this their production was stopped as a result in June of the year 1883, only a year after their initial introduction. The same year the Korean government would purchase equipment for the production of milled coinage from the German Empire.

=== Korean government mint in Seoul issues ===
Half a decade after the issuing of the Dae Dong coins, between the years 1886 and 1888 (starting from "開國 497", or Kaeguk 497), the Korean government mint in Seoul (京成典圜局, 경성전환국), which was opened in November 1886 at the Namdaemun, began producing a minor number of machine-struck coins denominated in mun (文, 문) and hwan ("warn", "whan" 圜, 환). The general superintendent of the mint at the time was Paul Georg von Möllendorff. Möllendorff had a pair of essays struck in Germany, these coins had coin patterns similar to those of contemporary Japanese coins – a dragon encircled by inscriptions on the obverse side of the coin and a wreath with a crest enclosing the denomination on the reverse side of the coin. In this system the mun was worth 1/1000 "warn". They would only be produced in three different denominations, these were the 5 mun (5 文), 10 mun (10 文), and 1 warn (1 圜).

The milled coins of the second series were first struck using the aid of Japanese technicians and in 1886 with the aid of three German technicians. But as the German technicians were soon proven to be too expensive for the Korean government, they were replaced with employees from the Japan Mint in Osaka only a year later in 1887. By late 1887 more than 20 Japanese mint workers were on the staff.

Before any of these newly designed machine-struck coins were prepared for general circulation, a Korean politician tried to turn the monetary reforms back towards the older coinage designs and these new coins didn't see much circulation.

List of machine-struck coins produced by the Korean government mint in Seoul:

Machine-struck coins produced by the Korean government mint in Seoul (京成典圜局)
Obverse image	Reverse image	Value	Technical parameters				Description			Years of production
Obverse image	Reverse image	Value	Diameter	Thickness	Mass	Composition	Edge	Obverse	Reverse	Years of production
		5 mun	21.7 mm	1.5 mm	2.8 grams	98% copper, 1% tin, and 1% zinc	Plain/Smooth	A Korean dragon chasing a flaming wish-granting pearl within a beaded circle, and legends around the border; text "年(七/六/五)十九百四國開鮮朝大 ○ 문오 ○ 5 MUN".	Denomination in wreath.	1886–1888
		10 mun	27.5 mm	1.5 mm	6.5 grams	98% copper, 1% tin, and 1% zinc	Plain/Smooth	A Korean dragon chasing a flaming wish-granting pearl within a beaded circle, and legends around the border; text "年(七/六/五)十九百四國開鮮朝大 ○ 십문 ○ 10 MUN".	Denomination in wreath.	1886–1888
		1 warn	38 mm	2.5 mm	26.95 grams	90% silver and 10% copper	Plain/Smooth	A Korean dragon chasing a flaming wish-granting pearl within a beaded circle, and legends around the border; text "年(七/六/五)十九百四國開鮮朝大○원일○ 416•1 WARN • 900".	Denomination in wreath.	1886–1888

Only a total of 1,300 coins of the 1 warn denomination were struck, making them quite rare. While mintage figures for the 5 and 10 mun coins were not published, the total value of the coins struck around 2,800 warn. As these new milled coins were not that well received by the Korean public, they soon were culled from circulation.

== Commemorative coins ==
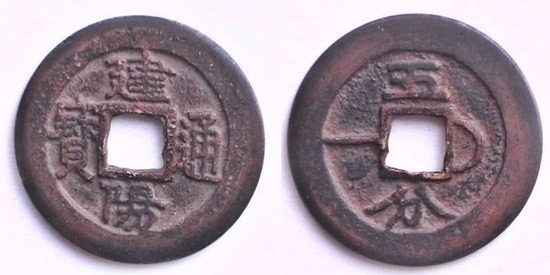
The Geonyang Tongbo (建陽通寶) commemorative cash coin.

Following the signing of the Treaty of Shimonoseki in April 1895, ending the Sino-Japanese War, the treaty contained provisions which made Korea fully independent from the Qing dynasty which ruled China. In the year 1896 in honour of this newfound independence King Gojong had adopted the regnal title Geonyang (建陽, "Founded Superior") and for the first time in Korea's monetary history a cash coin was cast with the King's reign year title, Geonyang Tongbo (建陽通寶, 건양통보). These were commemorative cash coins and would not be placed in general circulation.

== Banknotes ==
During late 19th century the only modern banknotes circulating in Korea were issued by the Dai-Ichi Bank, a Japanese bank which operated several branches in Korea. Following the establishment of the Korea Customs Service in the year 1883, the Dai'ichi Kokuritsu Ginkō received permission from it to act as a customs agent.

From the year 1884 the Dai'ichi Kokuritsu Ginkō started issuing customs drafts which were for use in settling duties. These drafts were recognised as an easy way to transfer funds and would find their way into ordinary commerce of Korea at the time, despite this, the Korean government never issued any formal authorisation for the Dai'ichi Kokuritsu Ginkō to issue any paper money in Korea. While the Dai'ichi Kokuritsu Ginkō inspired many Korean businessmen to create their own banks based on it during the 1890s, but these Korean banks never started issuing their own banknotes.

The Korean government did not issue any banknotes itself during this era. In the year 1893 the government established an exchange office (Tai Whan Shou) which was to withdraw the old Korean mun coinage and exchange it for the new Korean yang currency. The government exchange office prepared notes which would function a type of receipt until the withdrawn Korean mun coins could be re-minted, but these banknotes were never issued. Only a few specimens of these exchange notes survived.

Except for the Dai-ichi customs drafts, no other form of paper money would circulate in Korea until the turn of the century.

In the year 1900, which was 8 years after the currency had been formally abolished, the Japanese-owned Keijo-Pusan Railway Company (경부철도 청부인조합) issued banknotes denominated in 50, 100, 300, and 500 mun. The Tong Sun Tai Hoa also issued a banknote with the denomination of 10.000 mun.

Banknotes of the Keijo-Pusan Railway Company (1900)
Image		Value	Main Colour	Description		Date of issue
Obverse	Reverse	Value	Main Colour	Obverse	Reverse	Date of issue
		50 mun (五拾文)	Dark blue	Image of a steam train; denomination; text.	Company logo; text; company seal.	1900
		100 mun (百文)	Brown	Image of a steam train; denomination; text.	Company logo; text; company seal.	1900
		300 mun (三百文)		Image of a steam train; denomination; text.	Company logo; text; company seal.	1900
		500 mun (五百文)	Orange	Image of a steam train; denomination; text.	Company logo; text; company seal.	1900

== See also ==
- Chinese wen
- Vietnamese văn
- Japanese mon
- Ryukyuan mon
- Korean numismatic charm

== Sources ==
- Bank of Korea (韓國銀行) - 韓國의 貨幣 / Korean Money (in Korean using mixed script and English). Publisher: Bank of Korea Publishing (韓國銀行 發券部), Seoul (1982).
- Bank of Korea (1994). "韓國의 貨幣 / Korean Currency" (in Korean). Seoul: Bank of Korea Publishing.
- C.T. Gardner - The Coinage of Corea and their Values. ASIN B0007JDTW0, 60 pages (1 January 1963).
- Standard Catalog of World Coins – 1801–1900 (6th ed.). Krause Publications. 2009.
- Kurt Schuler (2004-02-29). Tables of modern monetary history: Asia. Currency Boards and Dollarization.
- op den Velde, Wybrand; Hartill, David (12 November 2013). Cast Korean Coins and Charms. New Generation Publishing. ISBN 978-0755215942.
- Alan D. Craig, and Mario L. Sacripante. The Coins of Korea and an Outline of Early Chinese Coinages. Publisher: Ishi Press International. Published: 5 April 2011. ISBN 4871878953

Preceded by: No modern predecessor	Currency of Korea ? – 1892; Concurrent with: Chinese currencies	Succeeded by: Korean yang Reason: currency reform
