= Joseon Tongbo =

Joseon-era Korean cash coin

Joseon Tongbo (朝鮮通寶)
- Joseon
- Value: 1 mun, 10 mun, 1 jeon
- Composition: Copper-alloy
- Years of minting: 1423–1425, 1625–1633, 1881 (10 mun and 1 jeon)

Obverse
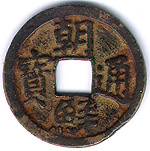
- Design: Joseon Tongbo (朝鮮通寶)

Reverse
- Design: Blank (1 mun) 十 (10 mun) 戸 / 户 - 一錢 (1 jeon)

Korean name
- Hangul: 조선통보
- Hanja: 朝鮮通寶
- RR: Joseon tongbo
- MR: Chosŏn t'ongbo

The Joseon Tongbo (Korean: 조선통보; Hanja: 朝鮮通寶) was an inscription used on Korean cash coins during the Joseon period first from 1423 until 1425 and later again from 1625 until 1633. Initially the attempt to introduce coinage to Korea proved unsuccessful as had been the case when the Goryeo state had attempted to issue its own coinage centuries earlier. But during the second attempt the Korean economy had evolved to become more reliant on trade and the need for coinage began to challenge the prevalence of barter in Korean society. In the year 1633 the Stabilisation Office (常平廳, Sangpyeongchŏng) introduced the Sangpyeong Tongbo cash coins whose popularity would cause the Joseon Tongbo inscription to be phased out.

In the year 1881 the Korean government experimented with producing high denomination Joseon Tongbo cash coins, however, these were never issued.

== History ==
=== 1423–1425 ===
During the early years of the Joseon period cloth and grains would remain the most common forms of currency among the Korean people, during this time cotton was considered to be the most important medium of exchange. The government of Joseon also recognised the prominent role that cotton played in the Korean economy and the highest quality specimens of cotton would be stamped with the text "Joseon Tongpyejiin", which could be seen as a government seal of approval and meant that it could be used as currency throughout Korea. Barter would remain the norm in Joseon society for many generations before the reintroduction of cash coinage.

Bronze coins were cast starting in 1423 during the reign of king Sejong the Great with the Joseon Tongbo (조선통보, 朝鮮通寶) cash coins. The coins produced under Sejong were pegged to copper at 160 coins to one Kŭn (斤, 근) which is equal to 600 grams, though the actual market rates regularly fluctuated. But the monetary system proved to be unpopular as people resorted back to barter after a few years.

The Sejong era Joseon Tongbo cash coins were only issued in the years 1423 (Sejong 5), 1424 (Sejong 6), and 1425 (Sejong 7) and all of these cash coins distinctively use the regular script font of Chinese characters which tended to be both clearly and distinctively inscribed while their reverse sides tend to be blank (blank reverses are known as "光背"). This first series of Joseon Tongbo are generally about 24 millimeters in diameter and tend to weigh between 3.2 and 4 grams. These cash coins were modeled after the Chinese Tang dynasty era Kaiyuan Tongbao (開元通寶, Gaewon Tongbo) cash coins.

The first series of Joseon Tongbo cash coins ceased production only briefly after its introduction due to a lack of raw materials as well as the exchange rate having fallen to less than the intrinsic value of the coinage making them financially unattractive.

The Kings of Joseon were consistently creating new legislation aimed at promoting coins and promoted their manufacture to be widely used. Through these measures, the monarchs hoped to dispel the general mistrust that the Korean people had towards coinage and they also hoped that these decrees would boost the value of Korean cash coins.

Following the Japanese invasions of Korea it had become more necessary for there to be circulating coinage in Korea, this was needed in order to both procure military supplies and secure the national finances.

=== 1625–1633 ===
In 1625 under the reign of king Injo of Joseon a new series of cash coins with the same inscription as under Sejong the Great were minted. In order to promote the circulation of the new coinage, King Injo tried to rent out vacant rooms for the opening of new restaurants which would accept these cash coins, these rooms were situated in front of the palace Gyeongbokgung. This was an attempt to encourage the circulation of the new coinage and the King hoped to open the eyes of the Korean people to the value of using coinage over barter.

"The street in front of Gyeongbokgung Palace would make an ideal place for restaurants. I would like to gather people to manage restaurants there. I believe those restaurants will help deal with the thirsty and hungry."

— Injo Sillok (Annals of King Injo), June 18, 1626 (Year 4 of King Injo of Joseon)

The government soon enacted new national laws to stimulate the usage of coinage, for instance a law that allowed for people to pay their taxes using coins. Government officials were now also required to use cash coins to pay for their expenses when they would travel as a means to help promote their circulation. Another factor that led to the more widely adoption of coinage by the Korean people this time around was the fact seasonal problems such as droughts or less productive harvests made it more difficult to manufacture grains and cloth causing them to decrease in circulation.

The second series of the Joseon Tongbo came roughly two centuries after the first and the first issues were made in the year 1625 (Injo 3), these cash coins had their inscriptions written in "official style" script or palbun (八分, "eight part (script)"). During this era the government wasn't the only manufacturer as private minting was allowed to take place and as such these cash coins tend to be very diverse.

The second series of Joseon Tongbo cash coins tend to have a rather yellow-brown colour and the Hanja characters depicted on them were not very standardised. The character strokes can be either thin or thick and either small or large. Some varieties of this series have broad rims while others tend to have very narrow rims. Unlike with the first series of the Joseon Tongbo cash coins, Joseon Tongbo cash coins with inscriptions written using the clerical script (隸書) typeface are much more scarce.

In the year 1651, King Hyojong issued a royal decree which ordered the people of Joseon to use the Joseon Tongbo cash coins and it also prohibited the usage of cloth as a currency. During this era the private production of cash coins was also allowed.

A sudden and major increase in agricultural production during the reign of King Sukjong paved the way for the opening of about 1,000 markets across Korea, this led to the development of commerce and industry in the country which in turn gave a more favourable market for the circulation of coinage. The brisk production of goods to be traded and the subsequent development of commerce led to there being a relatively stable currency system during this era. These new markets and the merchants that they brought with them substantially raised the importance of currency, cash coins were now highly valued due to their ease of transportation and storage.

This second series of Joseon Tongbo coins became the inspiration for the following Sangpyeong Tongbo series, though later these coins would be suspended due to the Later Jin, and the Qing invasions of Joseon. After those wars Korea would become dependent on importing copper from Japan in order to sustain the production of coinage.

=== 1881 ===
A number of different 10 mun and 1 jeon versions of the Joseon Tongbo cash coins were also created around the year 1881, these cash coins were experimental and therefore quite rare and not many contemporary records were written about them. These cash coins tend to have a diameter of 45 millimetres and tend to weigh around 30 grams and according to some reports they were 48.2 millimetres in diameter and had a weight of 29 grams. Some of them have blank reverse sides, these can be found in two different types which is dependent on whether the Chinese characters on the obverse side are written in a "small script" (小字) or a "large script" (大字), while others have the Hanja character "十" (십, "ten") located right above the square centre hole on the back.

The Joseon Tongbo cash coins with the denomination of 1 jeon were also only minted as an experimental issue and tend to have the mint mark of the Joseon Treasury Department on their reverse right above the square centre hole, this character was usually depicted as "戸", but can also sometimes be found as "户". On the right side of the square centre hole were the Chinese characters "一錢" (일전, il jeon), indicating its nominal value. The 1 jeon Joseon Tongbo cash coins was possibly 47.6 millimeters in diameter and allegedly had a weight of 31 grams.

During the time when the 1 jeon Joseon Tongbo cash coins were issued 400 mun (or 400 small cash coins of 1 mun) were valued as being worth 1 tael (兩, 양 or 냥) of silver. So in the new system planned for these Joseon Tongbo cash coins one coin of 1 jeon would have been worth forty coins of 10 mun and were themselves 1/10 of a tael.

Other variants of the 1 jeon Joseon Tongbo cash coins can have some slight variations in the method that the "head" (or top part) of the Chinese character Tong (通) is written. Furthermore, there can be variations in how the Chinese character Seon (鮮) is written as well, there can be slight differences in the way that the 4 bottom strokes (or "dots") of the "魚" are written as well as the method that the top part (or "head") of the "羊" is inscribed.

== Sources ==
- Bank of Korea (韓國銀行) - 韓國의 貨幣 / Korean Money (in Korean using mixed script and English). Publisher: Bank of Korea Publishing (韓國銀行 發券部), Seoul (1982).
- Bank of Korea (韓國銀行) - 韓國의 貨幣 / Korean Currency (in Korean using mixed script and English). Publisher: Bank of Korea Publishing (韓國銀行 發券部), Seoul (1994).
- C.T. Gardner - The Coinage of Corea and their Values. ASIN B0007JDTW0, 60 pages (1 January 1963).
- Won Yoo Han (원유한), 한국화폐사-고대부터 대한제국시대까지『Korean Currency - From Ancient to Korean Empire』, 한국은행 발권국 (Bank of Korea), 2006.
- Kwon In-hyuk (권인혁), 「Sejong University Coin Distribution Plan」(세종대의 동전유통책), 『Jeju National University Proceedings』(제주대학교 논문집) 19, Cheju National University (제주대학교), 1984.
- Park Pyeong-sik (박평식), 「The Early Monetary Policy and Saturation Distribution」(조선초기의 화폐정책과 포화유통), 『Oriental Journal』(동방학지) 158, Yonsei University Institute of Korean Studies (연세대학교 국학연구원), 2012.
