= Tenpō Tsūhō =

Japanese coin from the Edo period

One-hundred mon
- Tokugawa shogunate (Japan)
- Value: 100 Japanese mon
- Mass: 20.7 g
- Diameter: 49 (long) x 32 (wide) mm
- Thickness: 2.6 mm
- Edge: a shirushi (印) indicating the mint of origin.
- Shape: Ellipse
- Composition: 78% Copper; 12% Lead; 10% Tin
- Years of minting: 1835 - 1870
- Catalog number: Standard Catalog of World Coins C#7.1 & C#7.2

Obverse
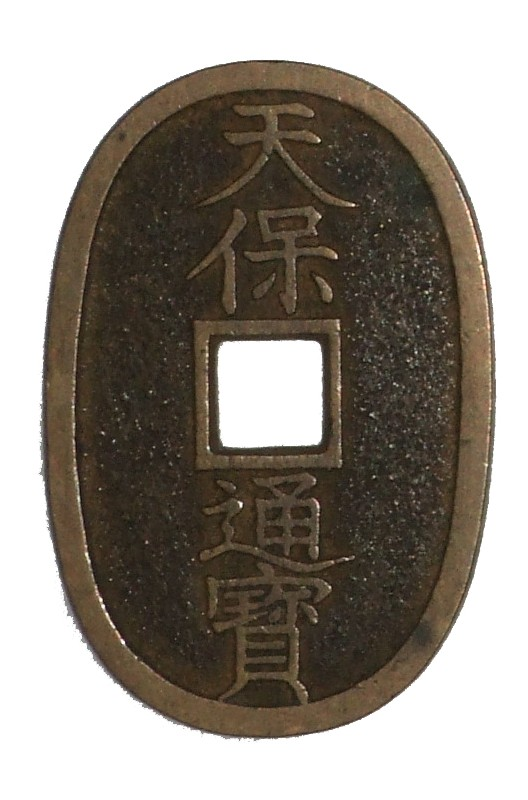
- Design: 天保通寳 (Tenpō Tsūhō)

Reverse
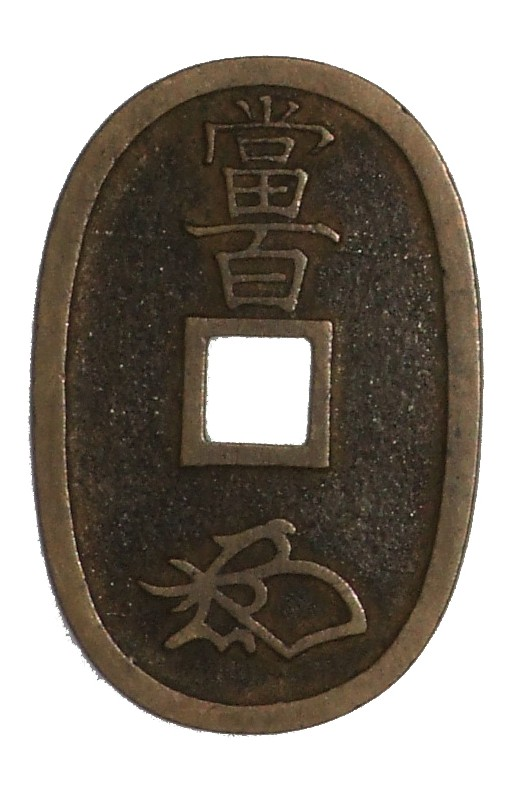
- Design: 當百 (Tō Hyaku, equals 100), and the Kaō of Gotō San'emon.

The Tenpō Tsūhō (Japanese: 天保通宝; kyūjitai: 天保通寳 or 天保通寶) was an Edo period coin with a face value of 100 mon, originally cast in the 6th year of the Tenpō era (1835). The obverse of the coin reads "Tenpō" (天保) a reference to the era this coin was designed in, and "Tsūhō" (通寳) which means "circulating treasure" or currency. The Kaō is that of Gotō San'emon, a member of the Kinza mint's Gotō family (後藤家), descendants of Gotō Shozaburo Mitsutsugu, a metalworker and engraver from Kyoto appointed by shōgun Tokugawa Ieyasu in 1600 to oversee the Edo mint of his shogunate and oversee its coinage. All mother coins were produced in Edo (present day Tokyo) before they were sent to other mints where they would place the individual mint's mark (shirushi, 印) on the edge of the coin. The coin circulated for 40 years, and stopped being produced during the Meiji Restoration after the introduction of the Japanese yen. Today these coins are now sold as "lucky charms" as well as being collected by numismatists.

== History ==
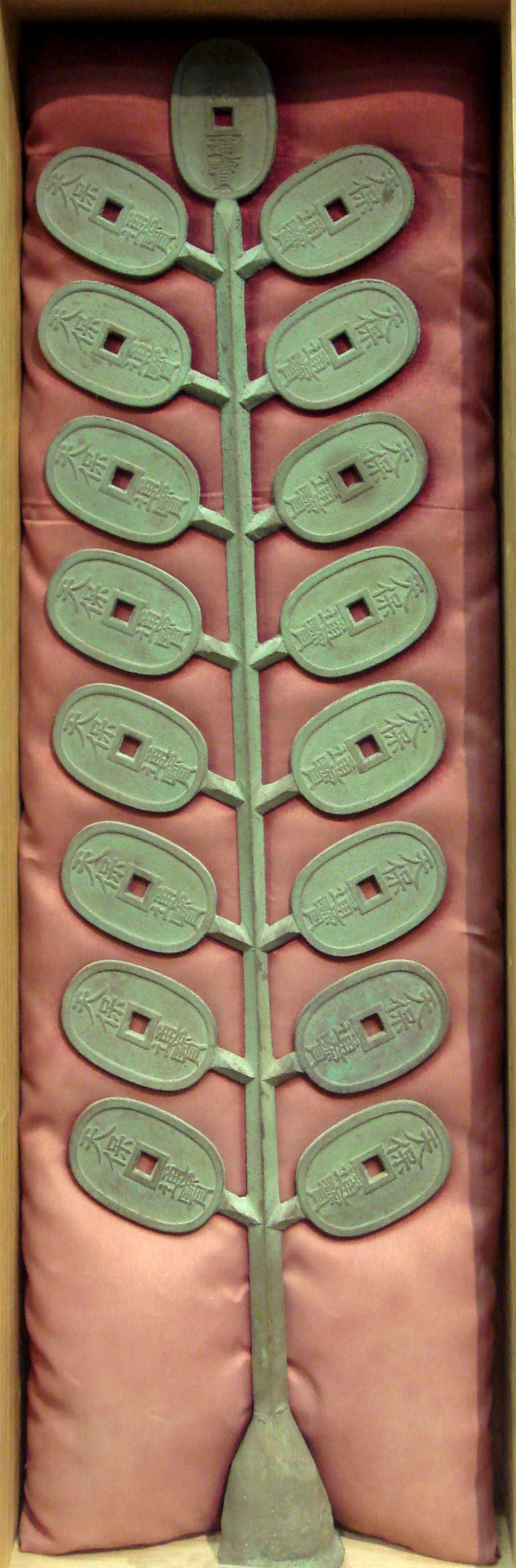
An "Edasen" (枝銭) made from Tenpō Tsūhō coins.

The Tenpō Tsūhō came around a century after the introduction of the Hōei Tsūhō (Kyūjitai: 寳永通寳; Shinjitai: 宝永通宝) during the 5th year of the Hōei era (1708), which had a face value of 10 mon (while only containing 3 times as much copper as a 1 mon Kan'ei Tsūhō coin), but was discontinued shortly after it started circulating as it wasn't accepted for its nominal value.

The Tokugawa government started issuing the 100 mon coin in 1835 as a way to combat its fiscal deficit, but due to the debasement of the copper in the 100 mon denomination (5 1/2 times a 1 mon Kan'ei Tsūhō coin) which lead to chronic inflation in commodity prices, this has been compared by economic historians to the inflation caused by the introduction of the 100 wén minted by the Qing dynasty due to the Taiping Rebellion in 1853, or the 100 mun coin issued by the Kingdom of Joseon in 1866, both of which were also cast to combat government deficits. Unlike the Chinese 100 wén whose production stopped after a single year, and the Korean 100 mun which was only produced for 172 days, the Tenpō Tsūhō continued to be produced for the duration of the Edo period. Despite this the actual market value of the Tenpō Tsūhō was significantly lower than its face value and was estimated only at 80 mon during the end of the Bakumatsu in 1869, while the coin had become the most commonly circulated mon denomination; accounting for 65% of all mons circulating at the time.

Between 1835 and 1870 a total of 484,804,054 Tenpō Tsūhō coins were produced.

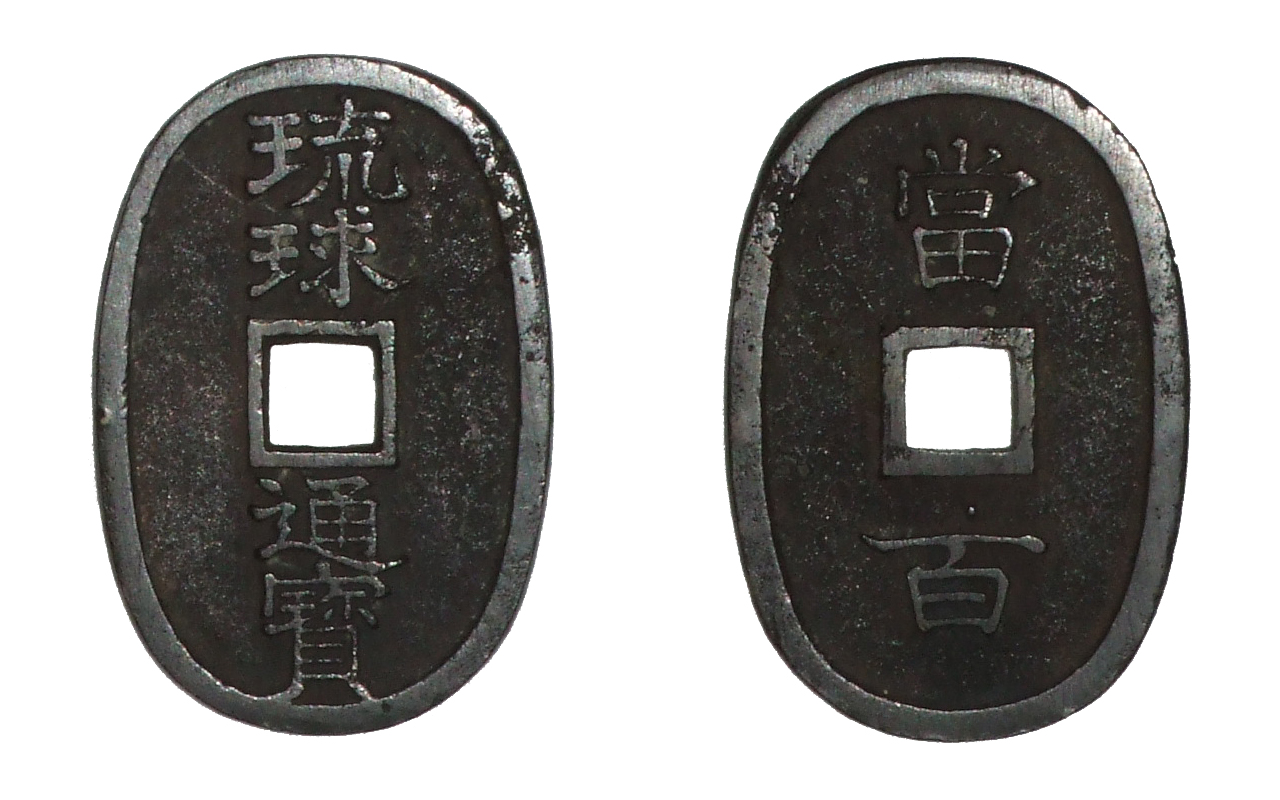
A Ryūkyū Tsūhō (Kyūjitai: 琉球通寳; Shinjitai: 琉球通宝) of 100 mon, a coin designed to look like the Tenpō Tsūhō

From 1862 a similar coin with a nominal value of 100 mon based on the Tenpō Tsūhō was minted by the Satsuma domain under the reign of daimyō Shimazu Nariakira (under the guise of producing currency for the Ryukyu Kingdom), as with the Tenpō Tsūhō this was done to combat that domain's deficit. This proved successful and the Satsuma coin started to circulate all over Japan as well.

== Glico Caramel Box imitation coins ==
In the 1950s coin collecting had become popular in Japan which lead Ezaki Glico to give away Tenpō Tsūhō coins as prizes to children who had collected points which could be accumulated from purchasing Ezaki Glico caramel boxes. As Ezaki Glico soon ran out of genuine Tenpō Tsūhō coins they started producing near identical fake Tenpō Tsūhō coins to meet the demand, these imitation Tenpō Tsūhō tend to have deeper cut characters on the coin's reverse. These Glico-produced coins are worth more than genuine Tenpō Tsūhō because of their scarcity.

== Cultural references ==
- The Tenpō Tsūhō is a collectable item in the 2013 American video game Tomb Raider, which can be obtained inside the Cliffside Bunker on Yamatai.

== Collectability ==
Tenpō Tsūhō coins are a prized coin in the numismatic community, but as over two dozen variants exist the price of each coin is dependent not only on the quality of the individual coin but on various other factors such as mint marks and era, ranging from ¥1,250 (or around $12) to ¥300,000 (or around $2,800), though more worn out coins sell for as low as $4.

== See also ==
- Great Qing Treasure Note
- Economic history of Japan#Edo period
- Dangbaekjeon
- Japanese currency
- Wadōkaichin
- Tự Đức Bảo Sao
