= Korean yang =

1892–1902 currency of Korea

- Yang
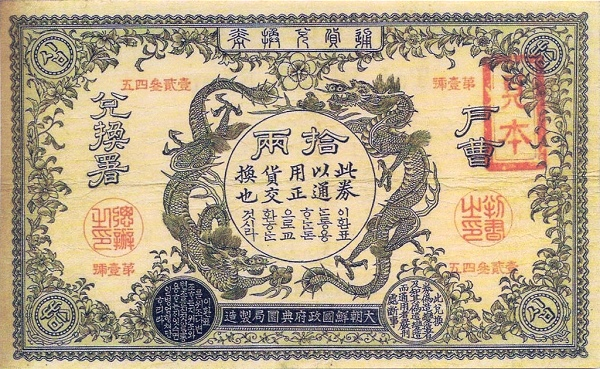
- An unissued 10 yang banknote.

Korean name
- Hangul: 양 or 냥
- Hanja: 兩
- Revised Romanization: yang or nyang
- McCune–Reischauer: yang or nyang

- Bun
- Hangul: 분 or 푼
- Hanja: 分
- Revised Romanization: bun or pun
- McCune–Reischauer: pun or p'un

The yang (Korean: 양; Hanja: 兩) was the currency of the Korean states Joseon and the Korean Empire between 1892 and 1902. It was subdivided into 10 jeon (전; 錢) or 100 bun (분; 分); and 5 yang = 1 hwan (환; 圜).

== Etymology ==
The word yang (兩) is a cognate of the Chinese "tael" (Chinese: 兩; pinyin: Liǎng). Fun (pronounced "pun" but spelt with an "f" on the coins), is also a cognate of a Chinese word, 分; Fēn, which is equal to 1/100 yuan, whilst hwan is a cognate of yuan itself.

== History ==
Just before the yang was introduced, a small number of coins denominated in hwan (환/圜) and mun (문/文) were minted (1 won = 1000 mun). It is unclear whether these coins circulated. The 1 won and 5 yang coins were equal in size, containing 416 grains of silver. However, before 1892, the main currency of Korea was the mun, a denomination based on the Chinese cash (Chinese: 文; pinyin: Wén).

The mintage and circulation of modern currency began during the last years of the Joseon dynasty as a result of contact with the West, using equipment to produce machine-struck coins purchased from Germany in 1883. The Osaka Copper Works (大阪製銅會社) run by Nobuyuki Matsuda (增田信之), a Japanese firm foreseeing profit in the coin minting business, suggested to the Korean government to establish another mint in the port city of Incheon. Incheon was selected by the Japanese because it would then be more easy to bring mint machinery from Japan to Korea.

In November of the year 1892, a new mint was established in the city of Incheon which led to the old mint for machine-struck in Seoul to be demolished. New machinery and raw materials used for producing milled coinage were imported from Japan. The new Incheon Mint (仁川典局) was entirely staffed by Japanese technicians from the Osaka Copper Works and from the Japan Mint in Osaka. The Incheon Mint prepared a completely new line of coins with very heavily inspired Japanese designs, this series also included the first copper-nickel of Korea. The Incheon Mint was relocated to the Yongsan Mint (龍山典局) in the year 1900, the Yongsan Mint officially opened on 4 May 1900. However, the timing of this relocation was very unfortunate as the Korean Empire had started the construction of the Gyeongin Line which opened on 18 September 1899 and allowed for coins minted in Incheon to be transported at a wider distance. Minting equipment from Incheon was moved to Yongsan in September of the year 1900 and cupronickel coins at this time were struck in small quantities. The Yongsan Mint would close in November 1904 after the Japanese Empire took the rights of issuing money for circulation in Korea.

During the introduction of the Korean yang following the adoption of the silver standard, the dates on the coinage still followed the Kaeguk calendar which was based on the founding of Joseon in the year 1392 which was the year Kaeguk 1 (開國元年). But following the proclamation of the Korean Empire in the year 1897 the era names or regnal years of the Emperor of Korea were used instead. King Gojong became Emperor Gwangmu and in the year 1897 the year Gwangmu 1 (光武元年) appeared on the coins. The Gwangmu regnal year was used well after the adoption of the Korean won until the year 1907, when the regnal years changed due to the ascension of Emperor Yunghui making the Gregorian year 1907 into Yunghui 1 (隆熙元年).

Various names of Korea were displayed on the coins, these include "Great Joseon" (大朝鮮), "Joseon" (朝鮮), and "Great Han" (大韓).

Around the time of the trial adoption of the gold standard in 1901, gold and silver coins were in circulation along with some Japanese bank notes.

The yang was replaced by the won at a rate of 1 won = 10 yang.

== Coins ==
Coins were minted in the denominations of 1 fun, 5 fun, 1/4 yang, 1 yang, 5 yang and 1 hwan. The coins all carried the title of the state, "Great Joseon" (Great Korea; 대조선; 大朝鮮), then just "Joseon" (Korea; 조선; 朝鮮) and then Daehan (대한; 大韓). The name of the country on these new coins, as it had been on the coins issued in the year Kaeguk 497, was "Great Korea". But on the insistence of the Chinese resident-general Yuan Shikai the Chinese character "大" (dae) was removed from coins produced in the years Kaeguk 502, Kaeguk 503, and early Kaeguk 504. The reason why Yuan Shikai demanded this was because Korea, which at the time was a vassal state of the Qing dynasty, said that the inclusion of the character "大" was an affront to the Chinese Empire.

Until 1897, the dynastic dating system was used, where the founding year of the Joseon dynasty, 1392, was year 1. Starting in 1897, the regnal year of the monarch was used instead. Because the era name changed into the regnal name during the transition into the Korean Empire only a very limited amount of coins was struck during this era. Because the cupronickel 1/4 yang was the most profitable to produce this denomination saw a large amount of counterfeiting of it, the amount of counterfeits in Korea became so uncontrollable that the imperial government declared them to be legal tender, this policy proved to be disastrous as the public would soon distrust the coinage.

Most of the coins of the Korean yang were produced at the Incheon Mint (仁川典局) but from 1898 coins were also produced at the Yongsan Mint (龍山典局).

1 fun coins were produced during the years 1892 (開國五百一年), 1893 (開國五百二年), 1895 (開國五百四年), and 1896 (開國五百五年). It's notable that they weren't produced in 1894 (開國五百三年). All 1 fun coins were produced at the Incheon Mint.

5 fun coins were made during the years 1892 (開國五百一年), 1893 (開國五百二年), 1894 (開國五百三年), 1895 (開國五百四年), 1896 (開國五百五年), 1898 (光武二年), 1899 (光武三年), and 1902 (光武六年), but not during the years 1897 (光武元年), 1900 (光武四年), and 1901 (光武五年). There are varieties of the 5 fun with small characters (小子), medium-sized characters (中子), and large characters (大字). All 5 fun coins produced until 1899 were minted at the Incheon Mint, while the 5 fun coins of 1902 were produced at the Yongsan Mint.

The 1/4 yang coins (or 2 jeon and 5 pun coins) were produced during the years 1892 (開國五百一年), 1893 (開國五百二年), 1894 (開國五百三年), 1895 (開國五百四年), 1896 (開國五百五年), 1897 (光武元年), 1898 (光武二年), 1899 (光武三年), 1900 (光武四年), and 1901 (光武五年). The varieties of the 1/4 yang coins include those produced with small characters (小子) and large characters (大字). Until the year 1897 they were produced at the Incheon Mint, but from 1898 they were produced at the Yongsan Mint.

The 1 hwan coin was only produced in the year Kaeguk 502 (開國五百二年) or 1893 in the Gregorian calendar.

=== Counterfeit cupronickel ¼ yang coins ===
The majority of the 1/4 yang coins were dated Gwangmu 2 (1898) and the coin dies used to produce them were replaced with others that had the same date of issue after they had become worn out. Official coin dies were also rented out to licensees, and at one point even to non-licensees. The Japanese first struck cupronickel coins in Osaka that were later imported to Korea, then they imported the machinery used to manufacture them and struck them in Korea. Some of the unofficially produced 1/4 yang coins can not be distinguished from the genuine specimens.

The Korean government would eventually establish a system for designating cupronickel coins as being "Official", "Class-A counterfeits", and "Class-B counterfeits", these coins all had varying market values. Even the government produced "official" coins were accepted at a discount, this was because base cupronickel coins had completely flooded the market. This uncontrollable situation would lead to more than half of all currency circulating in Korea at the time being cupronickel coins. Removing these coins from circulation would prove to be a tough predicament for the Japanese during the latter half of the 1900s.

=== List of Korean yang coinage patterns ===
Korean yang coins
Denomination	Composition	Diameter (in millimeters)	Weight (in grams)	Thickness (in millimeters)	Mintage	Obverse image	Reverse image
1 pun (一分)	Brass (95% copper and 5% aluminum)	23.4	3.3	1			
5 pun (五分)	98% copper, 1% tin, and 1% zinc	27	6.9	1.5			
¼ yang (二錢五分)	Cupronickel (Note: 75% copper and 25% nickel.)	20.7	4.8	2			
1 yang (一兩)	800‰ silver	22.5	5.2	1.5			
5 yang (五兩)	900‰ silver	38	26.95	2.5	19,923		
1 hwan (= 5 yang) (一圜)	900‰ silver	38	26.95	1.5	77		

== Banknotes ==
A series was printed by the Treasury Department but never issued. The denominations were 5 yang, 10 yang, 20 yang, and 50 yang.

Banknotes of the Korean yang
Image		Value	Main Colour	Description		Date of issue
Obverse	Reverse	Value	Main Colour	Obverse	Reverse	Date of issue
		5 yang				Unissued
		10 yang				Unissued
		20 yang				Unissued
		50 yang				Unissued

== Overstruck 5 fun coins that were used as counterfeit Chinese 10 wén coins ==
Not long after these new copper coins were introduced, black market counterfeit versions of the 10 wén appeared, illegal mints or "private mints" (局私) opened all over China and started producing more coins than the Qing government's set quotas allowed there to be circulating on the market. Both Chinese and foreigners soon started producing struck cash coins of inferior quality often with traces of the Korean 5 fun coins they were overstruck on, or with characters and symbols not found on official government issued coins. Joseon began minting modern-style machine-struck copper coins in 1892, which was 8 years before the Qing dynasty did so in China. These coins were often minted by Korean businessmen and former Japanese Samurai (specifically Rōnin) looking to make a profit on exchanging the low value copper coins into silver dollars as a single Chinese silver dollar had the purchasing power of 1000 Korean fun. The majority of the counterfeit coins bear the inscription that they were minted in either Zhejiang province or Shandong province, but they circulated all over the coastal regions of China. Because the hand-operated presses used by the counterfeiters did not exert enough pressure on the coins to sufficiently obliterate the inscriptions and symbols on the Korean 5 fun coins, the counterfeit Qing dynasty 10 wén coins made using this method would usually exhibit a combination of both the Chinese Great Qing Copper Coin and Korean 5 fun designs. For example, there can still be traces of a wreath surrounding the dragon or minor traces of the original Korean inscription.

== Sources ==
- Schuler, Kurt. "Tables of Modern Monetary History: Asia".
- Krause, Chester L.; Clifford Mishler (2004). Standard Catalog of World Coins: 1801–1900. Colin R. Bruce II (senior editor) (4th ed.). Krause Publications. ISBN 0873497988.
- Pick, Albert (1996). Bruce, Colin R. II; Shafer, Neil (eds.). Standard Catalog of World Paper Money: General Issues to 1960 (8th ed.). Krause Publications. ISBN 0-87341-469-1.

Preceded by: Korean mun (and Chinese currencies to some extent); Reason: currency reform	Currency of Korea; 1892 – 1902	Succeeded by: Korean won and Korean yen Reason: heavier influence by Japan; Ratio: 1 yen = 1 won = 10 yang
