= Ryukyuan mon =

Currency used in Ryukyu kingdom

琉球文 (Literary Chinese)
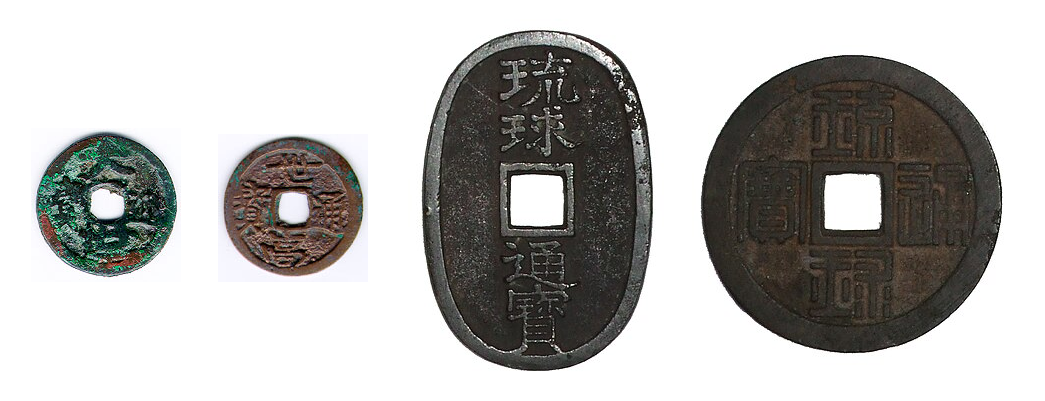
- A Taise Tsūhō (大世通寳), Sekō Tsūhō (世高通寳), Ryūkyū Tsūhō (琉球通寳) 100-mon, and Ryūkyū Tsūhō (琉球通寳) half-shu cash coins

Units of account
- Superunit
- 496: Shu (朱)
- 7936: Ryō (両)

Demographics
- Date of introduction: 1454
- Official user(s): Ryukyu Kingdom
- Unofficial users: Satsuma Domain (Japan) Okinawa Prefecture (until the 1880s)

Valuation
- Pegged with: (Japan) Japanese yen = 10,000 mon (from 1879)
- This infobox shows the latest status before this currency was rendered obsolete.

The Ryukyuan mon (琉球文, Ryūkyū mon; Okinawan: Ruuchuu mun) was the currency used in the Ryukyu Islands. The Ryukyuan monetary system was based on that of China, like those of many nations in the Sinosphere, with the mon (文) serving as the basic unit, just as with the Japanese mon, Vietnamese văn, and Korean mun. Like Japan had also done for centuries, the Ryukyuans often made use of the already-existing Chinese cash coins when physical currency was needed.

In the 14th and 15th centuries, the Kingdoms of Chūzan and Ryukyu produced their own coinage, but eventually transitioned back to Japanese mon and Chinese wén. Regardless of their origin, mon coins remained the de facto currency in the Ryukyu Kingdom throughout history up until 1879, when the kingdom was fully annexed by the Empire of Japan and the currency was officially replaced by the Japanese yen. Even after the introduction of the yen, however, mon coins continued to circulate within Okinawa Prefecture well into the 1880s, as the Ryukyuans were initially unwilling to use Japanese yen coins.

A second category of mon coins associated with the Ryukyu Kingdom are those bearing the name Ryūkyū Tsūhō (琉球通寳 "Ryukyu Currency"), which were minted by the Satsuma Domain, but were never actually used as regular currency in the Ryukyu Kingdom or Okinawa Prefecture. Instead, they were used as alternatives to the Japanese Tenpō Tsūhō coin and intended to bolster Satsuma's economy with additional coinage.

== Ryukyuan Coinage (14-15th century) ==
The first mon coin to be minted in the Ryukyus was the Chūzan Tsūhō (中山通寳), said to have been cast by the Kingdom of Chūzan sometime during the reign of King Satto (r. 1350–1395), before the unification of the island of Okinawa into the Ryukyu Kingdom in 1429. Only a dozen or so examples of this coin survive, and due to its scarcity, it is uncertain whether it was ever actually circulated.

The first coins minted by the united Ryukyu Kingdom were Taise Tsūhō (大世通寳) coins, produced in 1454 under King Shō Taikyū. Soon following this were Sekō Tsūhō (世高通寳) coins, which were first minted in 1461 under the reign of King Shō Toku. Both of these coins were designed by first taking Ming dynasty Yongle Tongbao (永樂通寳) coins, scraping off the characters "永樂", replacing them with either "大世" for Taise Tsūhō or "世高" for Sekō Tsūhō, and then using the result as a mother coin. Because copper shrinks when it cools, the Sekō Tsūhō was smaller than the Chinese Yongle Tongbao. The Sekō Tsūhō was originally cast to make up for a shortage of currency often attributed to reckless politics and high government expenditure, such as the expensive invasion of Kikai Island by King Shō Toku in the 1460s.

After King Shō Toku was overthrown in a coup d'état, the Second Shō Dynasty rose to the throne. Under the dynasty's first king, Shō En (r. 1469–1476), the last coin to be minted by the Ryukyu Kingdom, the Kin'en Yohō (金圓世寳) was minted in 1470, albeit not in great amounts, as Ming dynasty coinage was more widely used. After this, the Ryukyu Kingdom stopped manufacturing their own mon coins and relied exclusively on imported Japanese mon and Chinese wén as the main currency of exchange.

Below is a summary of the coins minted by the Kingdom of Chūzan and the Ryukyu Kingdom:

Inscription	Kyūjitai	Shinjitai	King	Dynasty	Image
Chūzan Tsūhō	中山通寳	中山通宝	Satto (r. 1350–1395)	Satto	
Taise Tsūhō	大世通寳	大世通宝	Shō Taikyū (r. 1454–1460)	First Shō	
Sekō Tsūhō	世高通寳	世高通宝	Shō Toku (r. 1460–1469)	First Shō	
Kin'en Yohō	金圓世寳	金円世宝	Shō En (r. 1469–1476)	Second Shō	

Despite the small size of the Ryukyu Kingdom, Taise Tsūhō and Sekō Tsūhō coins are not uncommon, and have been known to be regularly found on the Indonesian islands of Java and Sumatra due to the international nature of these coins and the success of Ryukyuan maritime trade. Kin'en Yohō coins are considerably less common, and Chūzan Tsūhō coins are incredibly rare.

Aside from the Chūzan Tsūhō coin, which is mentioned in 17th-century records, no official records exist of the production of these Ryukyuan coins, so it is sometimes taken into doubt that these coins were actually produced by the Ryukyu Kingdom.

== Ryūkyū Tsūhō (from 1862) ==
Starting in 1862, daimyō Shimazu Nariakira of Satsuma Domain ordered for the production of coinage known as Ryūkyū Tsūhō (琉球通宝, "Ryukyu Currency"). As the name suggests, the coins were ostensibly meant for circulation within the Ryukyu Kingdom, which was a vassal of Satsuma Domain. However, the coins were never actually introduced in the Ryukyu Kingdom, which continued to use Japanese and Chinese cash coins. Instead, the Ryūkyū Tsūhō coins were a means for Satsuma Domain to produce additional currency to combat its government deficit while circumventing the Tokugawa Shogunate's restriction on minting currency like the Tenpō Tsūhō, which could only legally be produced at the Edo Mint. These efforts were successful, and the Ryūkyū Tsūhō entered wide circulation not only in Satsuma, but also in Japan's other provinces soon after their production. In total, around one million ryō worth of Ryukyuan coins were minted from 1862 to 1865.

The coins were released in two denominations, the first with a face value of 100 mon (1/40 ryō), and the second with a face value of 1/2 of a shu (125 mon, 1/32 ryō). As these coins were minted in Satsuma Domain, they bear the mark of the katakana character "sa" (サ) stamped on their edge. On the 100-mon coin, this can be found on the left and right (long) edges, while on the half-shu coin, it can be found on the edge just above the character 寳 hō on the left side of the obverse.

=== 100-Mon Coin ===
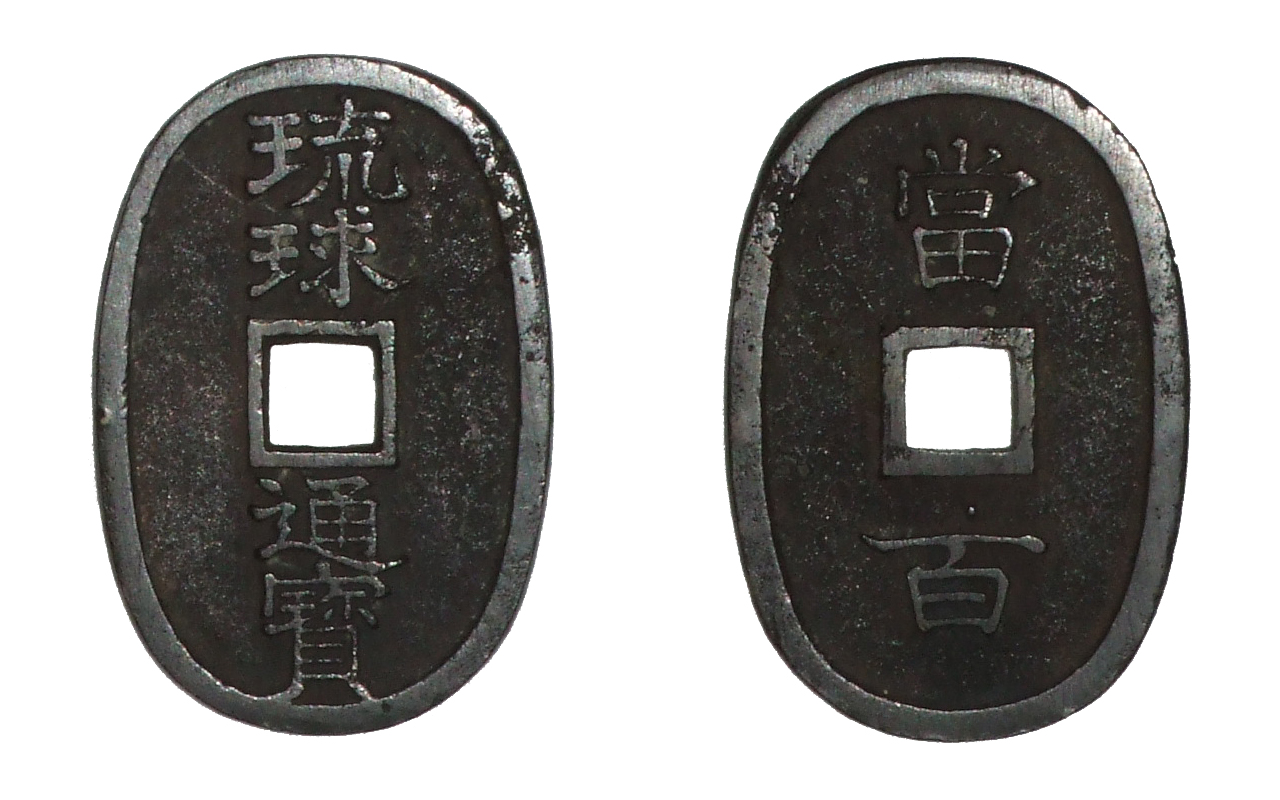
A 100-mon Ryūkyū Tsūhō coin

The 100-mon Ryūkyū Tsūhō was modeled after the official Japanese Tenpō Tsūhō (天保通寳) coin of the same denomination, being ellipse-shaped and having a square hole in its center. Its obverse has the words Ryūkyū Tsūhō (琉球通寳, "Ryukyu Currency"), and the reverse has tō hyaku (當百, "worth 100 [mon]"). The coin weighed 5 monme and 5 fun (equivalent to 20.6 grams), and it had dimensions of 49 mm by 32 mm.

Like the Tenpō Tsūhō after which it was modeled, it was heavily debased when compared to 1-mon coins, being merely 6 to 7 times as heavy as a typical 1-mon coin. Despite its face value of 100 mon, Satsuma Domain ordered that it would circulate at the value of 124 mon, which made it a profitable coin to manufacture.

=== Half-Shu Coin ===
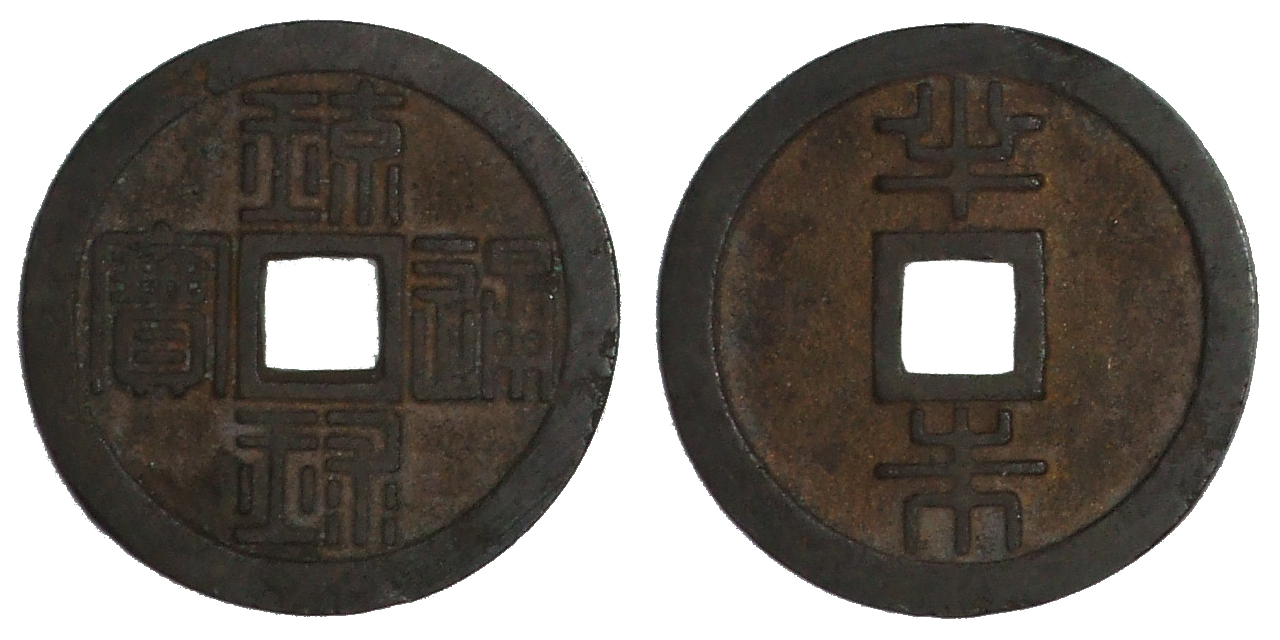
A half-shu Ryūkyū Tsūhō coin

The half-shu was circular with a square hole in the center. Its obverse has the words Ryūkyū Tsūhō (琉球通寳, "Ryukyu Currency"), and the reverse has han-ju (半朱, "half shu"). The coin weighed approximately 8 monme (30 to 32 grams), and it had a diameter of 1 sun and 4 bu (equivalent to 43 mm).

Like the 100-mon coin, it was heavily debased, being only 10 to 12 times as heavy as a typical 1-mon coin. Having a face value of one shu, it was nominally equivalent to 125 mon, but the Satsuma Domain government ordered for it to circulate at the value of 248 mon.

The shu (朱) is a Japanese unit of measurement used with gold currency, indicating that the Satsuma government was trying to fix the exchange rate between the copper mon coins and gold currency such as the koban. Officially, the value of 1/2 shu indicated a value of 1/32 ryō (両), though this conversion rate seems unlikely to have occurred in practice.

== See also ==
- B yen
- Tokugawa coinage
- Japanese currency

Preceded by: Chinese wén Reason: Local production.	Currency of the Ryūkyū islands 1454 – 1879	Succeeded by: Japanese yen Reason: Annexed by Japan. Ratio: 10.000 mon = 1 yen
