= Huachuanqian =

Type of cash coin with an octagonal hole

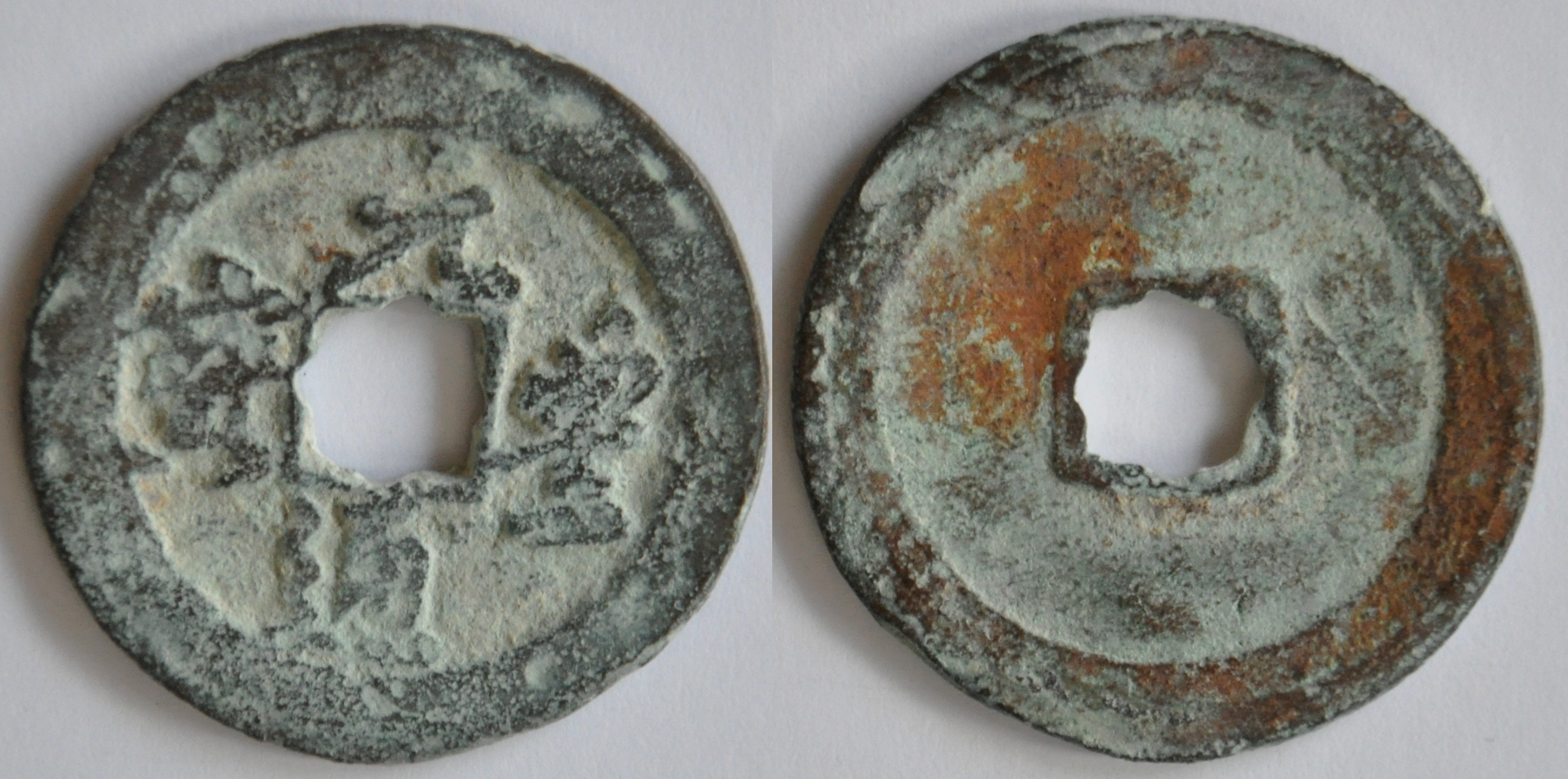
A Yuanfeng Tongbao (元豐通寶) cash coin from the Northern Song dynasty with a "flower (or 'rosette') hole" in the middle.

Cash coins with flower (rosette) holes (traditional Chinese: 花穿錢; simplified Chinese: 花穿钱; pinyin: huā chuān qián) are a type of cash coin with an octagonal hole as opposed to a square one, they have a very long history possibly dating back to the first Ban Liang (半兩) cash coins cast under the State of Qin or the Han dynasty. Cash coins are characterised by their round shape and square hole, but Huachuanqian are cash coins with an octagonal hole. These octagonal holes are mostly found in Chinese cash coins, but are in some rare instances also found in Japanese, Korean, and Vietnamese cash coins.

During the imperial period in Chinese history a relatively small number of Chinese cash coins were minted with what are termed "flower holes", "chestnut holes" or "rosette holes", these holes were octagonal but resembled the shape of flowers. The exact origin and purpose of these variant holes is currently unknown but several hypotheses have been proposed by Chinese scholars. While Huachuanqian are believed to have disappeared in China following the transition from Ming to Qing, they continued to appear among Korean cash coins until the Koreans abolished their cash coins.

Western numismatic sources often refer to these cash coins as having "star" holes. Among coin collectors Huachuanqian sell for a premium compared to their square holed counterparts with the same inscription. If the shape of these holes were only hexagonal then they were referred to as "turtle shell hole coins" (龜甲穿錢).

While initially the field of Chinese numismatics neglected the study of Huachuanqian, after an article published in the journal Chinese Numismatics in 1994 brought this phenomenon to mainstream attention, wider interest in these cash coins was generated and they have since been seen as their own separate category of cash coins.

== Characteristics ==
From the Warring States period of the Zhou dynasty until the early 20th century the standard cash coin was round with a square central hole. The round shape of the coin symbolised the supposed round shape of the sky, while the centre hole in this analogy is said to represent the planet earth (天圓地方). The body of these early round coins was called their "flesh" (肉) and the central hole was known as "the good" (好). Cash coins were generally cast as opposed to being hammered.

Over the millennia that they were issues by various dynastic states, the square hole in the centre of cash coins had experienced numerous, but minor changes over their long history. These changes resulted in the square hole in the centre being slightly bigger, smaller, elongated, misshaped, or at times they were filled with some excess metal from the production process. Despite these changes, the design and shape of cash coins have remained consistent throughout most of the monetary history of China, making cash coins easily recognised as being distinctively "Chinese" for over 2000 years. However, a relatively small number of cash coins that circulated in Chinese history notably had a differently shaped central hole with a recognisably artistic flair, namely hexagonal and octagonal central holes.

The Chinese typically refer to these eight-sided holed cash coins as having a "flower hole" (花穿), a "rosette hole", or a "chestnut hole". Besides the Mandarin term Huachuanqian (花穿錢) they are also known as Linghuachuanqian (菱花穿錢).

While some believe that these "flower hole" cash coins were accidentally created due to the incompetence of mint workers who produced faulty cash coins, others believe that these "flower holes" weren't mere accidental creations and had some sort of significance, meaning that they were intentionally created.

Huachuanqian are characterised by the fact that they have very distinct 8-sided central holes on both their obverse and reverse sides, though the number of sides can vary. Furthermore, vast majority of known "flower (rosette) holed" cash coins tend to have very clear inscriptions. Besides "flower holes", there are also "turtle shell holes" which have 6 sides instead of 8.

All sides of the hole are usually contained within the border of the cash coin's inner rim, which surrounds the hole in the middle.

== History ==
=== Production and circulation of Huachuanqian ===
The exact origins of the first appearance of Huachuanqian is difficult to determine as there are no written records that document them. However, archeological evidence has determined that the earliest known cash coins with "flower" holes had the inscription Ban Liang (半兩) and could have been cast either during the Qin dynasty period or by the succeeding Han dynasty. While these early contenders are quite well documented, other early examples of Huachuanqian include a number of types of Xin dynasty coinages, including Huo Quan (貨泉) cash coins and a variety of the Huo Bu (貨布) coin, a type of coinage produced during the reign of Emperor Wang Mang which resembled ancient Zhou dynasty period shovel- or spade shaped-money. Huachuanqian with the inscription Wu Zhu (五銖) are thought to be exceptionally rare and cash coins with "flower holes" aren't commonly seen throughout the first half of the first millennium. While the Huachuanqian is most closely associated with the establishment of the Tang dynasty where they became less rare, these earlier examples date 7 centuries before this occurred, meaning that they are much older than traditionally thought.

By the early Tang dynasty period, the appearance of Huachuanqian was already commonly seen in general circulation. Over time they would become more common as during the middle to later years of the Tang dynasty period, the Huachuanqian would circulate all over the various territories of the empire. Chinese scholar Ding Fubao noted that the appearance of Huachuanqian was most closely associated with Kaiyuan Tongbao cash coins and those of the Northern Song period.

In the periods subsequent to the Tang dynasty Huachuanqian would continue to be manufactured on fairly large numbers. A significant amount of Huachuanqian could be found throughout the Song dynasty period. Meanwhile the coinage produced by the Khitan-led Liao dynasty was largely based on the Northern Song dynasty coinage and likewise also feature a number of cash coins with "flower holes". Song dynasty cash coins with "flower (rosette) holes" can be found in all calligraphic styles of writing including seal script, clerical script, regular script, running script, and grass script. However, Huachuanqian would become less commonly seen during the reign of the Southern Song dynasty period Emperor Xiaozong. The reason for this decline in the quantity of Huachuanqian can possibly be attributed to 2 major reforms to the designs of the currency that appeared during his reign. Namely, until the year 1180 the Song dynasty produced "matched cash coins" (對錢, duì qián) which were cash coins with identical inscriptions written in different styles of Chinese calligraphy, after these coins were superseded by cash coins that included the year of production on their reverse sides the practice of casting cash coins with "flower holes" also seems to have drastically decreased. This practice started during the 7th year of the production of the Chunxi Yuanbao (淳熙元寶), which was produced from 1174 until the year 1189. This practice started with the traditional Chinese character "七" (7) appearing on the reverse sides of Chunxi Yuanbao cash coins in the year 1180, which was also the same year that the government of the Song dynasty abolished the issuance of "matched cash coins". Due to this it is hypothesised that "flower holes" were added to Chinese cash coins to signify a year or period of the year or possibly a location where a cash coin was produced (see below).

While the appearance of Huachuanqian saw an abrupt decline after Emperor Xiaozong ascended to the Chinese throne, Huachuanqian would continue to be produced, though now in drastically reduced quantities, during the subsequent dynasties.

During the Ming dynasty period "flower holes" were still (rarely) recorded in Hongwu Tongbao (洪武通寶) and Yongle Tongbao (永樂通寶) cash coins, with the Chongzhen Tongbao (崇禎通寶) series being the last recorded known cash coins to have "flower holes".

=== Modern studies and research into Huachuanqian ===
Centuries after their production many coin collectors regarded Huachuanqian as "rubbish" (垃圾品) coins and often mockingly referred to as "wild chrysanthemum" (野菊花) money. It wasn't until the numismatic researcher Zhang Hongming (张宏明) reported on them in an article entitled "The history and origins of Flower Hole Coins" (花穿钱的时代与成因问题) in Chinese Numismatics (中国钱币) published in 1994 that collector interest in Huachuanqian grew causing the Chinese coin collecting community to value Huachuanqian more causing it to grow into its own specialised sub-field of Chinese numismatics. The 4th issue of Chinese Numismatics the same year published a group of letters from readers, authors, and editors, after reading the response papers and letters, Zhang Hongming was deeply inspired to respond and expand his research into this field. These articles filled a big gap in the study of Chinese Huachuanqian.

== Hypotheses concerning their origin ==
=== Traditional explanation for flower hole coins - Mould shift ===
==== Chinese cash coins cast in clay, stone, or bronze moulds ====
The traditional explanation as to why a small number of cash coins have "flower holes" is due to the fact that early cash coins were produced using clay, stone, or bronze coin moulds. Cash coins were typically cast, contrasted to Western Eurasian coins which were typically hammered. Historians still debate when the "stack casting" method was first used, some believe that it originated during the Warring States period while others than it started sometime during the Western Han dynasty period by commoners. Ancient Chinese texts reporting on the appearance and circulation of cash coins with "flower (rosette) holes" traditionally concluded that their creation was the result of the 2 halves of the coin mould accidentally being shifted during the production process of the ancient Chinese casting method. The casting process in these early moulds worked in a way that two mould-sections were placed together, then the core of the mould was placed into the top area, then the bronze smiths would pour molten metal into an opening that was formed by a cavity that was located in its centre. This explanation claims that during the pouring of molten metal into the coin mould the top and bottom halves of the coin mould would rotate or shift changing the way that the central square hole would end up creating the hexagonal or octagonal hole typically of these coins.

A number of Chinese and Taiwanese numismatists and numismatic publications over the years have proposed this hypothesis, including the Concise Dictionary of Ancient Coins (簡明古錢辭典) published in 1988 and the book Practical knowledge of Chinese coins (中國錢幣實用知識圖說) published in 1989. However, this hypothesis has been heavily scrutinised by numismatists afterwards. For example, numismatic researcher Gary Ashkenazy of the PrimalTrek website notes that this traditional explanation is problematic as a mould shift wouldn't just shift the orientation of the central hole, but it would shift everything including the Chinese characters and any other symbols that were present on the obverse side of the cash coin. Gary Ashkenazy notes that as all symbols and inscriptions found on cash coins with "flower holes" tend to be as crisp and distinct as their ordinary square holed counterparts, debunking this traditional hypothesis as being "obviously inadequate". Numismatic researcher Zhang Hongming also notes these issues with this common hypothesis, further noting that cash coins which were cast with errors are known as "wrong money" (錯範錢, 错范钱) and don't typically resemble Huachuanqian.

Furthermore, all 8 sides of the "flower hole" and all 6 sides of the "turtle shell hole" are typically contained within the border of the cash coin's inner rim, which surrounds the hole in the middle of the coin. This means that Huachuanqian cannot have been created as the result of either a mould or sand tray shift, because then the inner rim's inside which surrounds the actual hole would likely also feature more sides if this hypothesis was correct. Finally, the issue with this hypothesis is the fact that 4 "additional" sides form a standard-sized square would merely be rotated about 45 degrees from the primary square central hole rather than create the effect we see in Huachuanqian.

==== Chinese cash coins cast in sand moulds ====
Cash coins with "flower holes" became more common with the introduction of the Kaiyuan Tongbao (開元通寶) during the reign of Emperor Gaozu of the Tang dynasty. During the Tang dynasty the "stack casting" with clay moulds was slowly phased out in favour of the "sand casting method" (翻砂法), this new methodology of coin casting used mother coins (母錢) allowing for a consistent design to be used when mass-producing cash coins.

Using this method, it isn't possible for a mould to shift as there was no longer a hard mould that could shift as was the case in the earlier casting method, meaning that "flower holes" could under no circumstances have been created during the casting process and were most likely created by hand after they were already cast.

=== Flower holes were intentionally created by hand ===
As the "flower holes" present in the Huachuanqian could not have been caused by an error at any time in the manufacturing process, it is reasoned that they were likely created sometime after the cash coins were already extracted from the coin moulds. Following the removal of the cash coins from their moulds, the coins would appear as if they were "leaves" of a "coin tree" (錢樹) where they had to be broken off, all excess copper-alloy had to be manually chiseled or filed off from the central holes. This is because the cash coins were still connected to each other by the channel-like "branches" that permitted the molten metal to be flown throughout the coin mould. The rod used during this post-removal chiseling process was square so that once the cash coins, with their square holes in the middle, were stacked onto the rod the coins could no longer rotate. The coin mint workers could then use a file to remove any metal excess sprue (stubs) leftover around the rims that were made during the casting process, making sure that in the result the outer rims of the cash coins were round.

It is suspected that the "flower holes" and "turtle shell holes" were produced during chiseling process, presumably while the employee of the manufacturing mint was doing the final details of the cash coins. As manually filing and chiseling cash coins was both an additional expense as well as time-consuming it is likely that the creation of "flower holes" and "turtle shell holes" was ordered by the manufacturer.

While the possibility exists that a small number of Huachuanqian were indeed the accidental creation of casting errors by mint workers using chisels to clear excess metal that had flown into the central hole area during coin casting process. However, as the quality of Tang and Song dynasty coinages was quite high it's unlikely that the supervisors would have allowed for a large number of these variant coins to be produced, pass quality control or be allowed to enter circulation.

== Possible meanings ==
While it is not known why Huachuanqian were produced as no historical records explain their appearance, a number of hypotheses exist to explain their possible meaning. While their creation may at times have been an error, the fairly large quantities of Huachuanqian that found their way into general circulation during the Tang and Song dynasty periods in particular, two Chinese dynasties which were generally renowned for their practice of producing cash coins with both high standards and high quality, would indicate that the common presence of Huachuanqian was likely an intentional embellishment. It is therefore believed that the presence of "flower holes" and "turtle shell holes" may have had an important significance.

The hypotheses explaining their possible significance include:

- "Flower holes" and "turtle shell holes" were a type of "mint mark" that signified either the location or the date of their production. A strength of this hypothesis is the fact that appearance of Huachuanqian drastically decreased after 1180, during the reign of Emperor Xiaozong, when "matched cash coins" were abolished and production years were included on the reverse sides of cash coins. If the "flower hole" up to this period was serving a similar function to the dates found after 1180, it may no longer have been useful to create Huachuanqian after the enacting of these changes.
- "Flower holes" and "turtle shell holes" fulfilled a similar symbolic function as other ancient symbols found on Chinese cash coins that are not well understood today, see "Han dynasty coinage § The emergence of Chinese numismatic charms", "Chinese numismatic charm § Chinese cash coins with charm features", and "Han dynasty coinage § Dots, crescents, circles, numbers, counting rods, Chinese characters, and other symbols appearing on coins".
- The six sides of a "turtle shell hole" may have been a homophonic pun in Mandarin Chinese, as the number 6 (六; liù) is a Mandarin Chinese homophonic pun with "prosperity" (祿; lù).
- Likewise for "turtle shell holes" the number 8 (八; bā), of their eight sides, is a homophonic pun in Mandarin Chinese with first character in the term for "to prosper" or "wealth" (發財; fā cái).
- Concurrently the Mandarin Chinese word for as "chestnut" (栗子|p=lì zi}}) as in the term "chestnut holes" could be a homophonic pun in Mandarin Chinese with the phrase "establishing sons" (立子; lì zi), which expresses a desire to produce male offspring.

== Cash coins with "turtle shell holes" ==
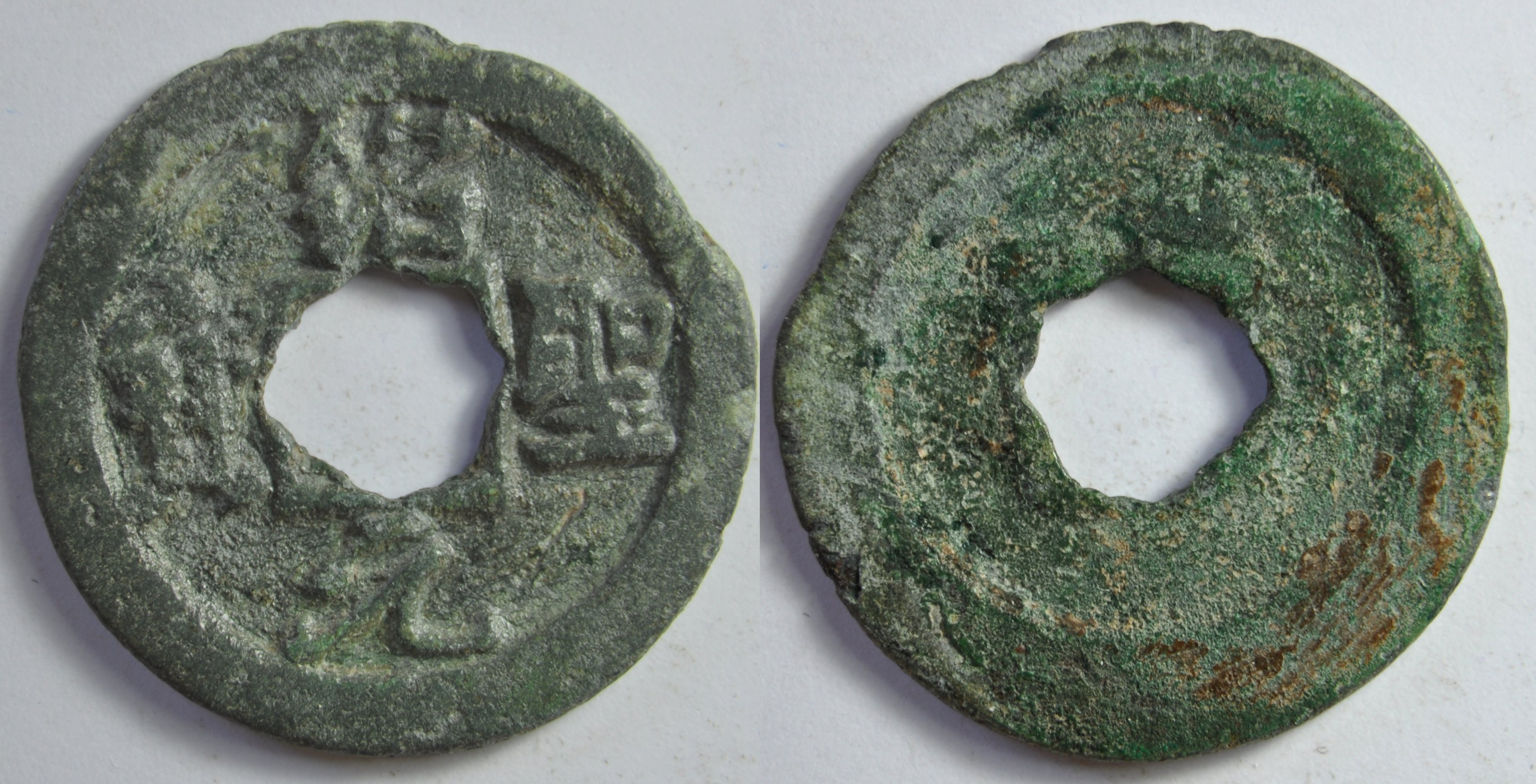
A Shaosheng Yuanbao (紹聖元寶) cash coin with a "turtle shell hole".

Cash coins with "turtle shell holes" (traditional Chinese: 龜甲穿錢; simplified Chinese: 龟甲穿钱; pinyin: Guījiǎ chuān qián) are similar to Huachuanqian, but rather than having eight-sided holes, these "turtle shell holes" are six-sided. Like Huachuanqian, the Guijiachuan have been subject to numismatic study and are often grouped together with the Huachuanqian when discussing their origins, circulation, and possible hidden meanings.

== Japan, Korea, and Vietnam ==
While Japanese, Korean, and Vietnamese cash coins are based on Chinese cash coins both in design and in production, the quality of the cash coins produced in Japan, Korea, and Vietnam varies greatly. The manufacturing techniques of these cash coins was also identical to those employed by Chinese cash coins. Yet, only very, very few cash coins from countries in the Sinosphere outside of China seem to display "flower holes". The general absence of "flower holes" in Japanese, Korean, and Vietnamese cash coins strengthens the hypothesis that Huachuanqian were intentionally created instead of being a result of poor casting quality, as "flower holes" would then be as common or more common in these other cash coins.

An example of a Korean cash coin with an eight-sided "flower hole" ("rosette hole") includes a Sangpyeong Tongbo (常平通寶) cash coin cast at the "Government Office of Pukhan Mountain Fortress", with the mint mark kyŏng (經). While Huachuanqian were very scarce in Chine until the Song dynasty period, cash coins with "flower holes" were gradually becoming rarer in subsequent dynasties and probably stopped being produced around the end of the Ming dynasty, which ended in 1644. Meanwhile, this Sangpyeong Tongbo cash coin with a "flower hole" was produced in 1830, several centuries after the last recorded Huachuanqian were seen in China.

== List of cash coins with "flower holes" or "turtle shell holes" ==
List of recorded cash coins with "flower holes":

Inscription	Traditional Chinese	Simplified Chinese	Period (Dynasty)	Type of hole	Diameter	Weight	Image
Chinese cash coins
Ban Liang (Note: This Ban Liang cash coin was cast during the Western Han dynasty period under the reign of Empress Lü Zhi and is an 8 zhu Ban Liang (八銖半兩錢). Flower holes on coins from the early Han dynasty are generally very scarce, and are among the earliest Huachuanqian that are known to exist.)	半兩	半两	Western Han dynasty	"Flower hole"	32 millimeters	3.8 grams	
Ban Liang	半兩	半两	Western Han dynasty	"Flower hole"	24 millimeters	3.3 grams	
Huo Quan (Note: This inscription, Huo Quan (货泉), could be translated as "wealth coin" or "money coin", and were created in the year 14 CE during the reign of emperor Wang Mang. Huo Quan cash coins with "flower holes" are typically considered to be among the most early examples of Huachuanqian. Notably, the "flower hole" on some of these Huo Quan specimens may not be as obvious as that on the cash coins that followed it.)	貨泉	货泉	Xin dynasty	"Flower hole"	28 millimeters	2.1 grams	
Wu Zhu (Note: Besides being a Huachuanqian, this specimen also displays a number of special characteristics occasionally found on cash coins. Below the square central hole are 3 "dots" present on the cash coin which the Chinese often refer to as "stars" (星). Above the square central hole are further 2 vertical lines which are believed to represent the number "two" (二), and connecting these two lines is an incused line creating what some believe is the Chinese seal script character for "work" (工).)	五銖	五铢	Eastern Han dynasty	"Flower hole"	23.5 millimeters	2.2 grams	
Wu Zhu	五銖	五铢	Eastern Han dynasty	"Flower hole"			
Zhi Bai Wu Zhu	直百五銖	直百五铢	Three Kingdoms period	"Flower hole"	26.37 millimeters	4.48 grams	
Taiping Baiqian (Note: Cast by the Kingdom of Shu Han. This is a small and thin specimen.)	太平百錢	太平百钱	Three Kingdoms period	"Flower hole"	19.5 millimeters	0.7 grams	
Kaiyuan Tongbao	開元通寶	开元通宝	Tang dynasty	"Flower hole"	25 millimeters	3.1 grams	
Qianyuan Zhongbao	乾元重寶	乾元重宝	Tang dynasty	"Flower hole"	23 millimeters	3.5 grams	
Qianyuan Zhongbao (Note: This particular Qianyuan Zhongbao cash coin has a double outer rim. This type of dual rim is known in China as a chonglun (重轮), which was intentionally done to indicate that this cash coin has a nominal value of 50 wén, meaning that 1 of these was equal to 50 ordinary cash coins.)	乾元重寶	乾元重宝	Tang dynasty	"Flower hole"	35 millimeters	15 grams	
Dali Yuanbao	大曆元寶	大历元宝	Tang dynasty	"Flower hole"	22.5 millimeters	2.6 grams	
Kaiyuan Tongbao - Yan (Note: This particular specimen is a Huichang Kaiyuan Tongbao cash coin. The Chinese character yan (兖) located above the "flower hole" of the Huachuanqian indicates that this Huichang Kaiyuan cash coin that was cast at the mint located at Yan Province in present-day Shandong.)	開元通寶 - 兗	开元通宝 - 兖	Tang dynasty	"Flower hole"	24 millimeters	3.1 grams	
Kaiyuan Tongbao - Zi	開元通寶 - 梓	开元通宝 - 梓	Tang dynasty	"Flower hole"			
Tianhan Yuanbao (Note: The inscription is read clockwise as Tianhan Yuanbao (天漢元寶). This cash coin was produced during the first year of the Tian Han reign, the year 917, under of King Wang Jian of the Former Shu (First Shu) Kingdom. This particular Tianhan Yuanbao cash coin specimen exhibits a "flower (rosette) hole".)	天漢元寶	天汉元宝	Five Dynasties and Ten Kingdoms period	"Flower hole"	23 millimeters	3.4 grams	
Qiande Yuanbao (Note: The inscription of this cash coin is read clockwise.)	乾德元寶	乾德元宝	Five Dynasties and Ten Kingdoms period	"Flower hole"	23.8 millimeters	3.1 grams	
Chunhua Yuanbao	淳化元寶	淳化元宝	Northern Song dynasty	"Flower hole"	24.4 millimeters	3.3 grams	
Zhidao Yuanbao (Note: The inscription is written in running script and is read clockwise.)	至道元寶	至道元宝	Northern Song dynasty	"Flower hole"	25 millimeters	3.5 grams	
Jingde Yuanbao (Note: Northern Song cash coins are known to be finely cast, this specific series of cash coins notably has deep well-made characters. The inscription is read clockwise, beginning at the top, and is written in regular script.)	景德元寶	景德元宝	Northern Song dynasty	"Flower hole"	25.9 millimeters	3.7 grams	
Xiangfu Yuanbao (Note: The inscription of this Xiangfu Yuanbao (樣符元寶) cash coin is read clockwise and is written using the regular script calligraphic style.)	樣符元寶	样符元宝	Northern Song dynasty	"Flower hole"	25 millimeters	3.5 grams	
Tianxi Tongbao (Note: The inscription of this Tianxi Tongbao (天禧通寶) cash coin is read clockwise and is written using the regular script calligraphic style..)	天禧通寶	天禧通宝	Northern Song dynasty	"Flower hole"	25 millimeters	3.5 grams	
Tiansheng Yuanbao (Note: The inscription of this Tiansheng Yuanbao (天聖元寶) cash coin is read clockwise and is written using the regular script calligraphic style.)	天聖元寶	天圣元宝	Northern Song dynasty	"Flower hole"	24.5 millimeters	2.6 grams	
Mingdao Yuanbao (Note: The inscription of this Mingdao Yuanbao (明道元寶) cash coin is read clockwise and is written using the regular script calligraphic style.)	明道元寶	明道元宝	Northern Song dynasty	"Flower hole"	26 millimeters	4.2 grams	
Huangsong Tongbao (Note: The inscription of this Huangsong Tongbao (皇宋通寶) cash coin is read top-to-bottom and then right-to-left. The inscription is written in seal script and the coin has a "flower hole".)	皇宋通寶	皇宋通宝	Northern Song dynasty	"Flower hole"	25 millimeters	3.5 grams	
Huangsong Tongbao	皇宋通寶	皇宋通宝	Northern Song dynasty	"Flower hole"	24.5 millimeters	3.35 grams	
Zhihe Tongbao (Note: The inscription of this Zhihe Tongbao (至和通寶) cash coin is read top-to-bottom and then right-to-left. The inscription is written in regular script and the coin has a "flower hole".)	至和通寶	至和通宝	Northern Song dynasty	"Flower hole"	25 millimeters	3.6 grams	
Zhihe Tongbao (Note: The inscription of this Zhihe Tongbao (至和通寶) cash coin is read top-to-bottom and then right-to-left. The inscription is written in seal script and the coin has a "flower hole".)	至和通寶	至和通宝	Northern Song dynasty	"Flower hole"	25 millimeters	3.4 grams	
Jiayou Tongbao (Note: The inscription of this Jiayou Tongbao (嘉祐通寳) cash coin is read top-to-bottom and then right-to-left. The inscription is written in seal script and the coin has a "flower hole".)	嘉祐通寳	嘉祐通宝	Northern Song dynasty	"Flower hole"	24.8 millimeters	3.3 grams	
Jiayou Tongbao	嘉祐通寳	嘉祐通宝	Northern Song dynasty	"Flower hole"	24 millimeters	3.87 grams	
Jiayou Yuanbao	嘉祐元寳	嘉祐元宝	Northern Song dynasty	"Flower hole"	24 millimeters	3.32 grams	
Zhiping Yuanbao (Note: The inscription of this Zhiping Yuanbao (治平元寶) cash coin is read clockwise and is written using Chinese seal script.)	治平元寶	治平元宝	Northern Song dynasty	"Flower hole"	25 millimeters	3.5 grams	
Zhiping Yuanbao (Note: The inscription of this Zhiping Yuanbao (治平元寶) cash coin is read clockwise and is written using the regular script calligraphic style.)	治平元寶	治平元宝	Northern Song dynasty	"Flower hole"	24 millimeters	4 grams	
Zhiping Tongbao (Note: The inscription of this Zhiping Tongbao (治平通寳) cash coin is read top-to-bottom and then right-to-left. The inscription is written in regular script and the coin has a "flower hole". The inscription of this cash coin is distinctive in that the character "Ping" (平), located at the bottom of the coin below the square hole, is written with 3 strokes at the bottom instead of merely 1.)	治平通寳	治平通宝	Northern Song dynasty	"Flower hole"	24.7 millimeters	4.1 grams	
Xining Yuanbao (Note: The inscription of this Xining Yuanbao (熙寧元寶) cash coin is read clockwise and is written using the regular script calligraphic style. The cash coin is a bit thicker than most Song dynasty period cash coins of the same size, which explains its weight of 5.5 grams.)	熙寧元寶	熙宁元宝	Northern Song dynasty	"Flower hole"	24.5 millimeters	5.5 grams	
Xining Yuanbao (Note: The inscription of this Xining Yuanbao (熙寧元寶) cash coin is read clockwise and is written using Chinese seal script.)	熙寧元寶	熙宁元宝	Northern Song dynasty	"Flower hole"	24.5 millimeters	3.8 grams	
Xining Yuanbao	熙寧元寶	熙宁元宝	Northern Song dynasty	"Flower hole"	24 millimeters	4.1 grams	
Xining Zhongbao (Note: Inscription written in Chinese seal script. Beginning in the year 1071, larger denomination cash coins, which were initially valued at 10 wén (equal to 10 regular cash coins) each, were manufactured. These large denomination cash coins were issued to pay for military expenses. However, later these cash coins were gradually devalued to be equal to 3 wén and finally to 2 wén.)	熙寧重寶	熙宁重宝	Northern Song dynasty	"Flower hole"	29 millimeters	8 grams	
Xining Zhongbao (Note: The inscription of this Xining Zhongbao (熙寧重寶) cash coin is read clockwise and is written using the regular script calligraphic style.)	熙寧重寶	熙宁重宝	Northern Song dynasty	"Flower hole"	32 millimeters	8.4 grams	
Yuanfeng Tongbao (Note: The inscription of this Yuanfeng Tongbao (元豐通寶) cash coin is written in "running" (cursive) script and is read clockwise, starting at the top. Not only does this Huachuanqian have a rather very prominent "flower hole", it also has a notably distinctive design on its rim (or "border"). The design of this rim has a number S-shaped curves and dots which could one of the Yin and Yang (阴阳), or Supreme Ultimate (太极, "Taiji"), symbol representing the basic polarities of the universe of light/dark, male/female, etc. Alternatively, this elaborate rim design can also be seen as stylised dragons chasing pearls. While at times the imperial Chinese government would create such cash coins which have these elaborate and distinctive rims, most coins that look like this are charms or amulets.)	元豐通寶	元丰通宝	Northern Song dynasty	"Flower hole"	30 millimeters	7.3 grams	
Yuanfeng Tongbao (Note: The inscription of this Yuanfeng Tongbao (元豐通寶) cash coin is read clockwise and is written using the running script calligraphic style.)	元豐通寶	元丰通宝	Northern Song dynasty	"Flower hole"	25 millimeters	3.6 grams	
Yuanyou Tongbao (Note: The inscription of this Yuanyou Tongbao (元祐通寳) cash coin is read clockwise and is written using Chinese seal script.)	元祐通寳	元祐通宝	Northern Song dynasty	"Flower hole"	24 millimeters	3.2 grams	
Yuanyou Tongbao (Note: Like the above cash coin with the same inscription. It read clockwise and is also written using Chinese seal script. A notable difference however, is that this specimen is considered to be a "large" cash coin, which at a higher denomination.)	元祐通寳	元祐通宝	Northern Song dynasty	"Flower hole"	30.5 millimeters	8.5 grams	
Yuanyou Tongbao (Note: Same inscription as the above, written in running script.)	元祐通寳	元祐通宝	Northern Song dynasty	"Flower hole"	25 millimeters	3.5 grams	
Shaosheng Yuanbao (Note: The inscription of this Shaosheng Yuanbao (紹聖元寶) cash coin is read clockwise and is written using Chinese seal script.)	紹聖元寶	绍圣元宝	Northern Song dynasty	"Flower hole"	24 millimeters	4 grams	
Shaosheng Yuanbao (Note: The inscription of this Shaosheng Yuanbao (紹聖元寶) cash coin, like the above one of the same inscription, is read clockwise and is written using Chinese seal script.)	紹聖元寶	绍圣元宝	Northern Song dynasty	"Turtle shell hole"	24.09 millimeters	2.6 grams	
Shaosheng Yuanbao (Note: Like the above cash coin with the same inscription (Shaosheng Yuanbao). It read clockwise and is also written using Chinese seal script. A notable difference however, is that this specimen is considered to be a "large" cash coin, which had a denomination of 10 wén (or 10 ordinary cash coins).)	紹聖元寶	绍圣元宝	Northern Song dynasty	"Flower hole"	31 millimeters	7.3 grams	
Shaosheng Yuanbao (Note: Same as the above, but written in running script.)	紹聖元寶	绍圣元宝	Northern Song dynasty	"Flower hole"	24.5 millimeters	3.6 grams	
Yuanfu Tongbao	元符通寶	元符通宝	Northern Song dynasty	"Flower hole"	25 millimeters	3 grams	
Shengsong Yuanbao	聖宋元寶	圣宋元宝	Northern Song dynasty	"Flower hole"	24.5 millimeters	3 grams	
Shengsong Yuanbao (Note: It is written in running script and the inscription is read clockwise beginning at the top.)	聖宋元寶	圣宋元宝	Northern Song dynasty	"Flower hole"	24.5 millimeters	3.5 grams	
Chongning Zhongbao	崇寧重寶	崇宁重宝	Northern Song dynasty	"Flower hole"	38 millimeters	12 grams	
Daguan Tongbao	大觀通寶	大观通宝	Northern Song dynasty	"Flower hole"			
Shaoxing Yuanbao (Note: The inscription of this 2 wén Shaoxing Yuanbao (紹興元寶) cash coin is read clockwise and is written using Chinese seal script. It has a crescent (or "moon") above the hole and a "star" (circle below the central hole on its reverse.)	紹興元寶	绍兴元宝	Southern Song dynasty	"Flower hole"	29.2 millimeters	7.6 grams	
Chunxi Yuanbao (Note: The inscription of this Chunxi Yuanbao (淳熙元寶) "large" cash coin is read clockwise and is written using Chinese seal script. It has a crescent (or "moon") above the hole and a "star" (circle below the central hole on its reverse.)	淳熙元寶	淳熙元宝	Southern Song dynasty	"Flower hole"	30 millimeters	6.7 grams	
Shaoxi Yuanbao (Note: The inscription of this Shaoxi Yuanbao (紹熙元寶) cash coin is read clockwise and is written using the regular script calligraphic style. The reverse side of this cash coin has the Chinese character yuan (元) below the central "flower hole" which could be translated as "first", meaning that it was cast in the year Shaoxi 1 (1190).)	紹熙元寶	绍熙元宝	Southern Song dynasty	"Flower hole"	24.4 millimeters	3.4 grams	
Qingyuan Tongbao (Note: Has the Chinese character "三" (3) on the reverse indicating that it was cast in the year Qingyuan 3 (1197).)	慶元通寶	庆元通宝	Southern Song dynasty	"Flower hole"	35 millimeters	3.8 grams	
Shaoding Tongbao (Note: Has the Chinese character "六" (6) on the reverse indicating that it was cast in the year Shaoding 6 (1233).)	紹定通寶	绍定通宝	Southern Song dynasty	"Flower hole"	24.3 millimeters	3.7 grams	
Duanping Tongbao	端平通寶	端平通宝	Southern Song dynasty	"Flower hole"			
Kaiqing Tongbao	開慶通寶	开庆通宝	Southern Song dynasty	"Flower hole"	25 millimeters	3.5 grams	
Zhongxi Tongbao	重熙通寶	重熙通宝	Liao dynasty	"Flower hole"	24 millimeters	2.7 grams	
Da'an Yuanbao	大安元寶	大安元宝	Liao dynasty	"Flower hole"	24.3 millimeters	3.2 grams	
Shouchang Yuanbao	壽昌元寶	寿昌元宝	Liao dynasty	"Flower hole"	23.8 millimeters	3.7 grams	
Qiantong Yuanbao	乾統元寶	乾统元宝	Liao dynasty	"Flower hole"	24 millimeters	3.4 grams	
Tianqing Yuanbao	天慶元寶	天庆元宝	Liao dynasty	"Flower hole"	24 millimeters	3.4 grams	
Zhenglong Yuanbao	正隆元寶	正隆元宝	Jin dynasty	"Flower hole"	25 millimeters	4.3 grams	
Hongwu Tongbao	洪武通寶	洪武通宝	Ming dynasty	"Flower hole"	23 millimeters	3.9 grams	
Yongle Tongbao (Note: This particular Yongle Tongbao (永樂通寶) cash coin was recovered from a Ming dynasty period shipwreck in the South China Sea.)	永樂通寶	永乐通宝	Ming dynasty	"Flower hole"	25.5 millimeters	3.4 grams	
Chongzhen Tongbao (Note: This Ming dynasty period cash coin is likely one of the last of the Chinese cash coins produced with a "flower hole".)	崇禎通寶	崇祯通宝	Ming dynasty	"Flower hole"	23.5 millimeters	2.5 grams	
Korean cash coins
Sangpyeong Tongbo - Kyŏng O	常平通寶 - 經五	常平通宝 - 经五	Joseon	"Flower hole"			
Sangpyeong Tongbo - Chun Ne Dang O (Note: Issued by the Ch'unch'on Township Military Office (春川管理營) in the year 1883, nominal value of 5 mun.)	常平通寳 - 春四當五	常平通宝 - 春四当五	Joseon	"Flower hole"	32 millimeters		
Vietnamese cash coins
Minh Đức Thông Bảo	明德通寶	明德通宝	Mạc dynasty	"Flower hole"	25 millimeters	5.5 grams	

== Sources ==
- 中國大百科全書(中國歷史), 中國大百科全書出版社 1994, ISBN 7-5000-5469-6.
- 中國歷代幣貨 - A History of Chinese Currency (16th Century BC – 20th Century AD), 1983 Jointly Published by Xinhua (New China) Publishing House N.C.N. Limited M.A.O. Management Group Ltd. ISBN 962 7094 01 3. (in Mandarin Chinese).
