= Hong Kong one-mil coin =

Obsolete Hong Kong coin

One mil
- Hong Kong
- Value: 0.001 HKD
- Mass: 0.98 g
- Diameter: 15 mm
- Thickness: 0.80 mm
- Edge: plain
- Composition: Bronze
- Years of minting: 1863 –1866
- Catalog number: -

Obverse
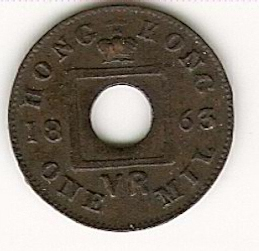
- Design: Hong Kong one mil
- Designer: William Robinson
- Design date: 1861

Reverse
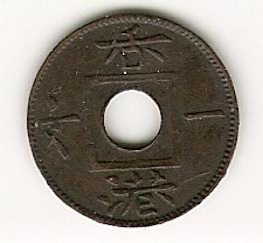
- Design: Chinese characters for Hong Kong and denomination
- Designer: William Robinson
- Design date: 1861

The one mil coin was the smallest denomination of the Hong Kong dollar from 1863 to 1866; after this date, it was no longer issued but may have circulated much longer. Its value was one tenth of a cent, or a thousandth of a dollar. It was minted by the Royal Mint, and featured the Royal cypher "VR" representing the reigning monarch Queen Victoria instead of her effigy as all other coins did due to the hole in the middle.

== Design ==
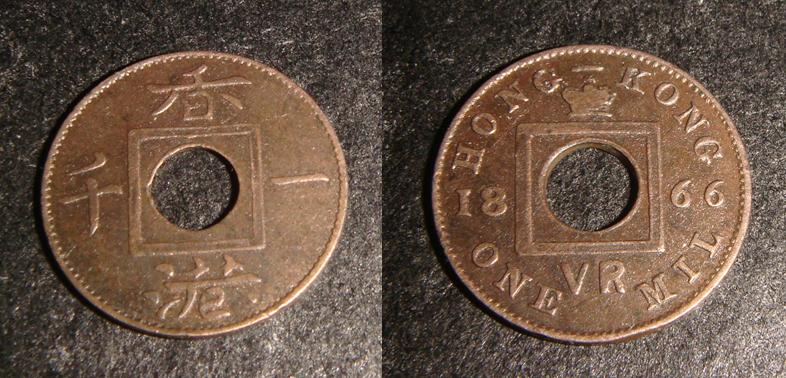
Hong Kong one-mil coin (1866) with Chinese characters “香港一千”

The obverse had denomination and country name in the English language. It featured the British crown and the initials 'VR' for Victoria Regina (Latin for Queen Victoria). While coins of the pound sterling have the royal title written in Latin, this is the only use of Latin on British Hong Kong coins. Royal titles were written in English on its other coins.

The reverse had the denomination and country name written in Chinese. From 1863 to 1866, the characters on this side was written as Hong Kong One-wen (香港一文), resembling the Chinese currency of cash at that time period. Among which, the 1866 One-wen is regarded as one of the rarest sample in Hong Kong coinage. Later on in 1866, the Chinese characters was altered to Hong Kong One-thousand (香港一千), indicating the value of a thousandth of a dollar.

== Mintages ==
=== Hong Kong One-wen variation ===
1863: 19,000,000

1864: Unknown

1865: 40,000,000 (Two variations exist – one with a hyphen between HONG and KONG on the obverse, one without hyphen between the two words)

1866: Unknown (Regarded as one of the rarest coins in Hong Kong coinage.)

=== Hong Kong One-thousand variation ===
1866: 20,000,000

== See also ==
- Cash (Chinese coin)
