= Cash (Chinese coin) =

Chinese coin

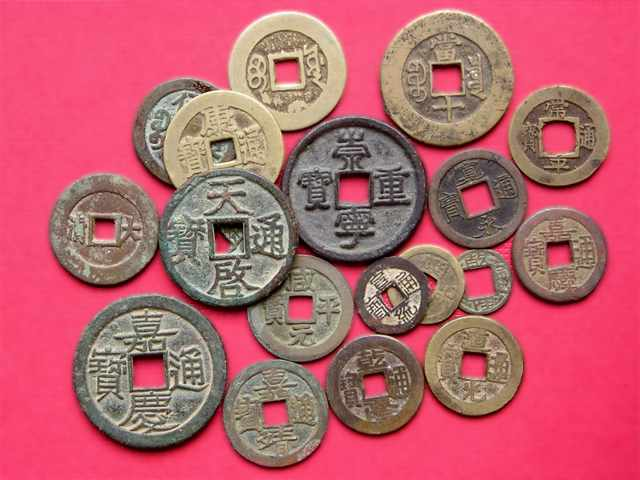
- Replicas of various ancient to 19th century cast cash coins in various metals found in China, Korea and Japan.

Chinese name
- Traditional Chinese: 方孔錢
- Simplified Chinese: 方孔钱
- Literal meaning: "square-holed money"
Transcriptions
Standard Mandarin
- Hanyu Pinyin: fāng kǒng qián
Yue: Cantonese
- Jyutping: fong1 hung2 cin4
Southern Min
- Hokkien POJ: hong-khóng-chîⁿ
- Tâi-lô: hong-khóng-tsînn

Alternative Chinese name
- Traditional Chinese: 銅錢
- Simplified Chinese: 铜钱
- Literal meaning: "copper money"
Transcriptions
Standard Mandarin
- Hanyu Pinyin: tóng qián
Yue: Cantonese
- Jyutping: tung4 cin4
Southern Min
- Hokkien POJ: tâng-chîⁿ
- Tâi-lô: tâng-tsînn

Second alternative Chinese name
- Traditional Chinese: 銅幣
- Simplified Chinese: 铜币
- Literal meaning: "copper currency"
Transcriptions
Standard Mandarin
- Hanyu Pinyin: tóng bì
Yue: Cantonese
- Jyutping: tung4 bai6
Southern Min
- Hokkien POJ: tâng-pè
- Tâi-lô: tâng-pè

Vietnamese name
- Vietnamese alphabet: đồng tiền
- Chữ Nôm: 銅錢

Japanese name
- Kanji: 銅銭
- Kana: どうせん
Transcriptions
- Romanization: Dōsen

Indonesian name
- Indonesian: uang kèpèng / uang keping / pitis

The cash or qian was a type of coin of China and the Sinosphere, used from the 4th century BC until the 20th century, characterised by their round outer shape and a square center hole (Chinese: 方穿; pinyin: fāng chuān; Jyutping: fong1 cyun1; Pe̍h-ōe-jī: hong-chhoan). Originally cast during the Warring States period, these coins continued to be used for the entirety of Imperial China. The last Chinese cash coins were cast in 1912, the first year of the Republic of China. Generally most cash coins were made from copper or bronze alloys, with iron, lead, and zinc coins occasionally used less often throughout Chinese history. Rare silver and gold cash coins were also produced. During most of their production, cash coins were cast, but during the late Qing dynasty, machine-struck cash coins began to be made. As the cash coins produced over Chinese history were similar, thousand year old cash coins produced during the Northern Song dynasty continued to circulate as valid currency well into the early twentieth century.

In the modern era, these coins are considered to be Chinese "good luck coins"; they are hung on strings and round the necks of children, or over the beds of sick people. They hold a place in various traditional Chinese techniques, such as Yijing divination, as well as traditional Chinese medicine, and feng shui. Currencies based on the Chinese cash coins include the Japanese mon, Korean mun, Ryukyuan mon, and Vietnamese văn.

== Terminology ==
The English term cash, referring to the coin, comes from the Portuguese caixa which was derived from the Tamil kāsu, a South Indian monetary unit derived from the Sanskrit silver and gold weight unit karsa. The English name was used for small copper coins issued in British India, and also came to be used for the similarly small value copper coins of China.

The English word cash meaning "tangible currency" is an older word, derived from the Middle French caisse, meaning "money box."

There are a variety of Chinese terms for cash coins, usually descriptive and most commonly including the character qián (Chinese: 錢; pinyin: qián) meaning "money". Chinese qián is also a weight-derived currency denomination in China; it is called mace in English.

== History ==
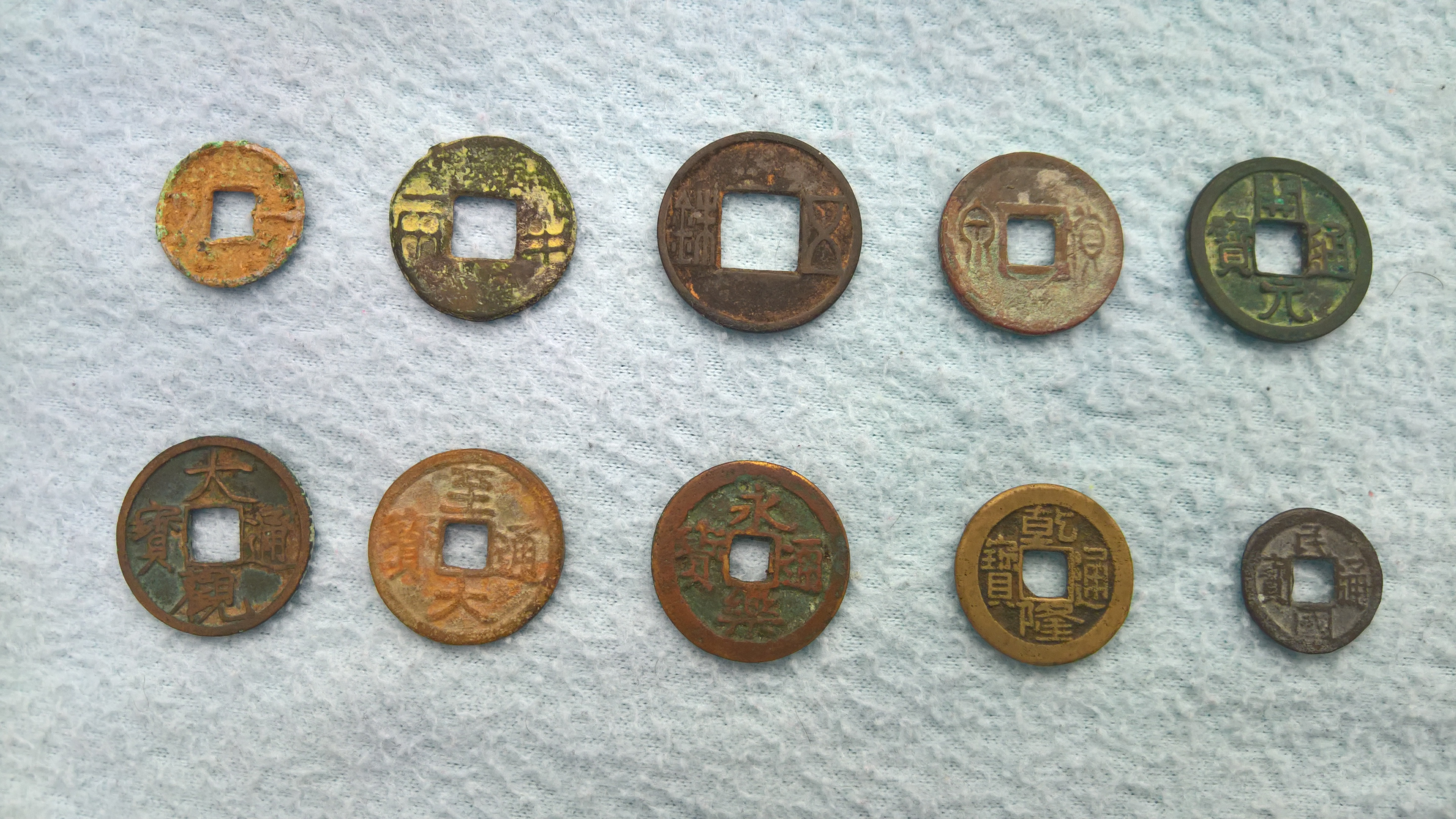
Cash coins minted between 330 BC and AD 1912.

=== Ancient China ===
Chinese cash coins originated from the barter of farming tools and agricultural surpluses. Around 1200 BC, smaller token spades, hoes, and knives began to be used to conduct smaller exchanges with the tokens later melted down to produce real farm implements. These tokens came to be used as media of exchange themselves and were known as spade money and knife money.

=== Imperial China ===
==== Qin to Sui dynasties ====
As standard circular coins were developed following the unification of China by Qin Shi Huang, the most common formation was the round-shaped copper coin with a square or circular hole in the center, the prototypical cash. The early Ban Liang cash coins were said to have been made in the shape of wheels, similar to other Ancient Chinese forms of coinage resembling agricultural tools. It is commonly believed that the early round coins of the Warring States period resembled the ancient jade circles (璧環) which symbolised the supposed round shape of the sky, while the centre hole in this analogy is said to represent the planet earth (天圓地方). The body of these early round coins was called their "flesh" (肉) and the central hole was known as "the good" (好).

The hole enabled the coins to be strung together to create higher denominations, as was frequently done due to the coin's low value. The number of coins in a string of cash (simplified Chinese: 一贯钱; traditional Chinese: 一貫錢; pinyin: yīguànqián) varied over time and place but was nominally 1000. A tael of pure silver in sycee form traded for a fluctuating price of approximately 1000 cash. A string of cash was divided into ten sections of 100 cash each. Local custom allowed the person who put the string together to take a cash or a few from each hundred for his effort (one, two, three or even four in some places). Thus a string of cash could contain 970 coins in one city and 990 in the next. In some places in the North of China short of currency the custom counted one cash as two and fewer than 500 cash would be exchanged for an ounce of silver. A string of cash weighed over ten pounds and was generally carried over the shoulder. (See Hosea Morse's "Trade and Administration of the Chinese Empire" p. 130 ff.) Paper money equivalents known as flying cash sometimes showed pictures of the appropriate number of cash coins strung together.

Following the Ban Liang cash coins the Han dynasty introduced the San Zhu cash coins which in the year 118 BC were replaced by the Wu Zhu cash coins. The production of Wu Zhu cash coins was briefly suspended by Wang Mang during the Xin dynasty but after the reestablishment of the Han dynasty, the production of Wu Zhu cash coins resumed, and continued to be manufactured long after the fall of the Eastern Han dynasty for another 500 years. Minting was definitively ended in 618 with the establishment of the Tang dynasty. Wu Zhu cash coins were cast from 118 BC to AD 618, a span of 736 years, which is the longest for any coin in human history.

==== Tang to Qing dynasties ====
The Tang dynasty introduced the Kaiyuan Tongbao, which would influence the inscriptions of cash coins, both inside and outside of China, minted from this period onwards.

The Koreans, Japanese, Ryukyuans, and Vietnamese all cast their own copper cash in the latter part of the second millennium similar to those used by China.

Chinese cash coins were usually made from copper-alloys throughout most of Chinese history, before 1505 they were typically made from bronze and from 1505 onwards they were mostly made from brass.

Chinese historian Peng Xinwei stated that in the year 1900 traditional cast copper-alloy cash coins only made up 17.78% of the total Chinese currency stock, privately-produced banknotes made up only 3%, and foreign trade dollars circulating in China (which mostly included the silver Mexican peso) made up 25% of the total Chinese currency stock by the 1900s. The context of traditional Chinese cash coins in the Chinese economy during the 1900s and its late stage in the monetary history of China is comparable to that of Western Europe's tiered currency systems used prior to the steam-powered mints, struck coinage, and territorial nation-state currencies between the 13th and 18th century. Helen Dunstan argues that the late-Imperial Chinese polity was much more preoccupied with maintaining national grain reserves and making the price of grain affordable to the Chinese people and the attention of the government of the Qing dynasty to the exchange rate of copper and silver would have to be viewed in this light.

The last Chinese cash coins were struck, not cast, during the reigns of the Qing Guangxu and Xuantong Emperors shortly before the fall of the Empire in 1911, though even after the fall of the Qing dynasty production briefly continued under the Republic of China.

=== Cash coins after the fall of the empire ===
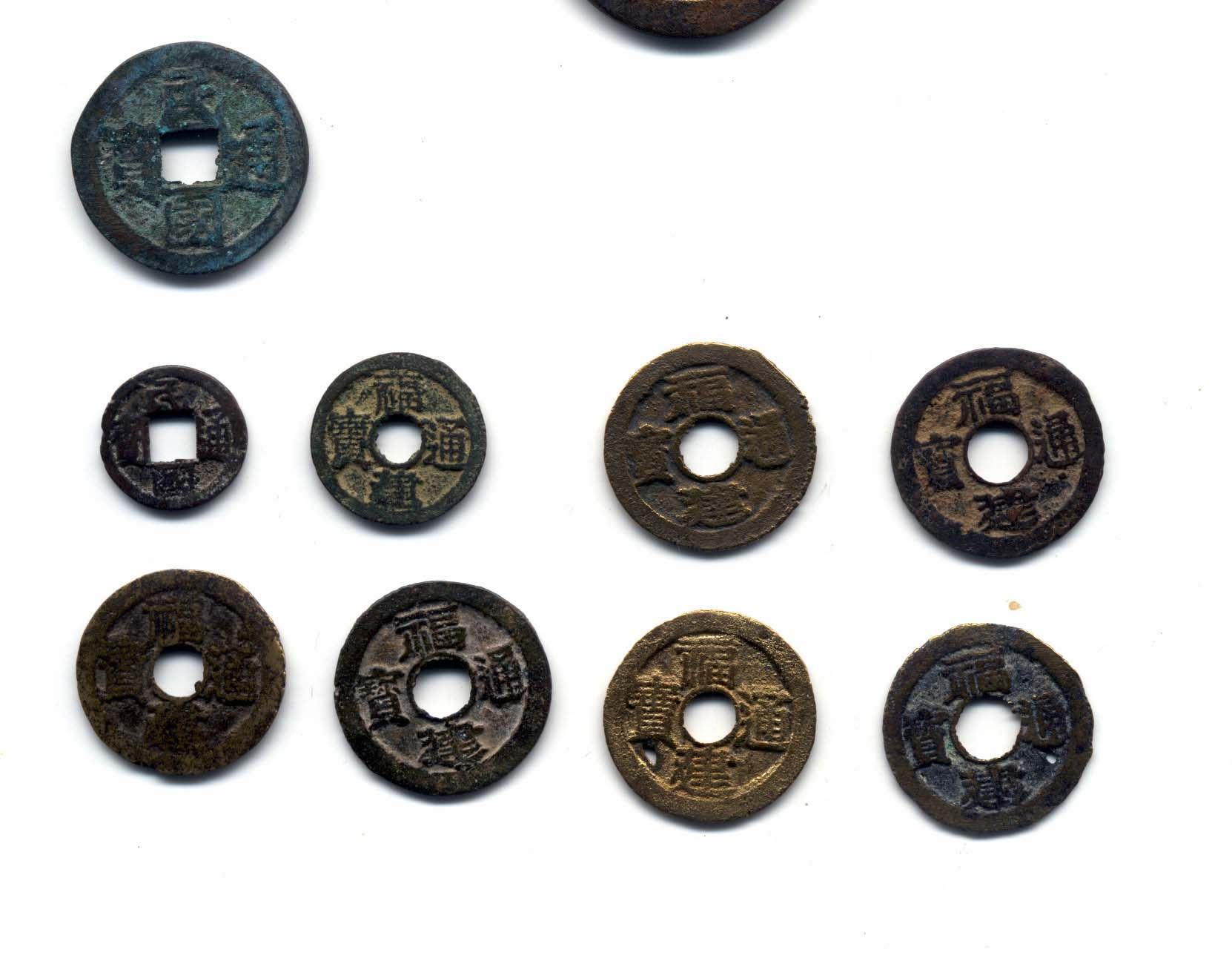
Various cash coins issued during the early Republic of China.

After the fall of the Qing empire, local production of cash coins continued, including the "Minguo Tongbao" (民國通寶) coins in 1912, but were phased out in favour of the new Yuan-based coins. During Yuan Shikai's brief attempt at monarchy as the Empire of China, trial cash coins are reported to have been minted as part of the Hong Xiang Tong Bao (洪憲通寶) series in 1916 but not circulated. During the Republican period cash coins with the inscription Fujian Tongbao (福建通寶) were produced in Fujian, these had the denominations of 1 wén and 2 wén. Trial coins with Fujian Sheng Zao (福建省造), Min Sheng Tong Yong (閩省通用; 闽省通用), and a Fujian Tong Bao with a reverse inscribed with Er Wen Sheng Zao (二文省造) were also cast, but never circulated. The coin continued to be used unofficially in China until the mid-20th century.

Vietnamese cash coins continued to be cast up until the early 1940s. The last Chinese cash coins in Indonesia circulated in Bali until 1970 and are still used for most Hindu rituals today.

== Manufacture ==
Traditionally, Chinese cash coins were cast in copper, brass or iron. In the mid-19th century, the coins were made of 3 parts copper and 2 parts lead. Cast silver coins were periodically produced but considerably more rare. Cast gold coins are also known to exist but are extremely rare.

=== Early methods of casting ===
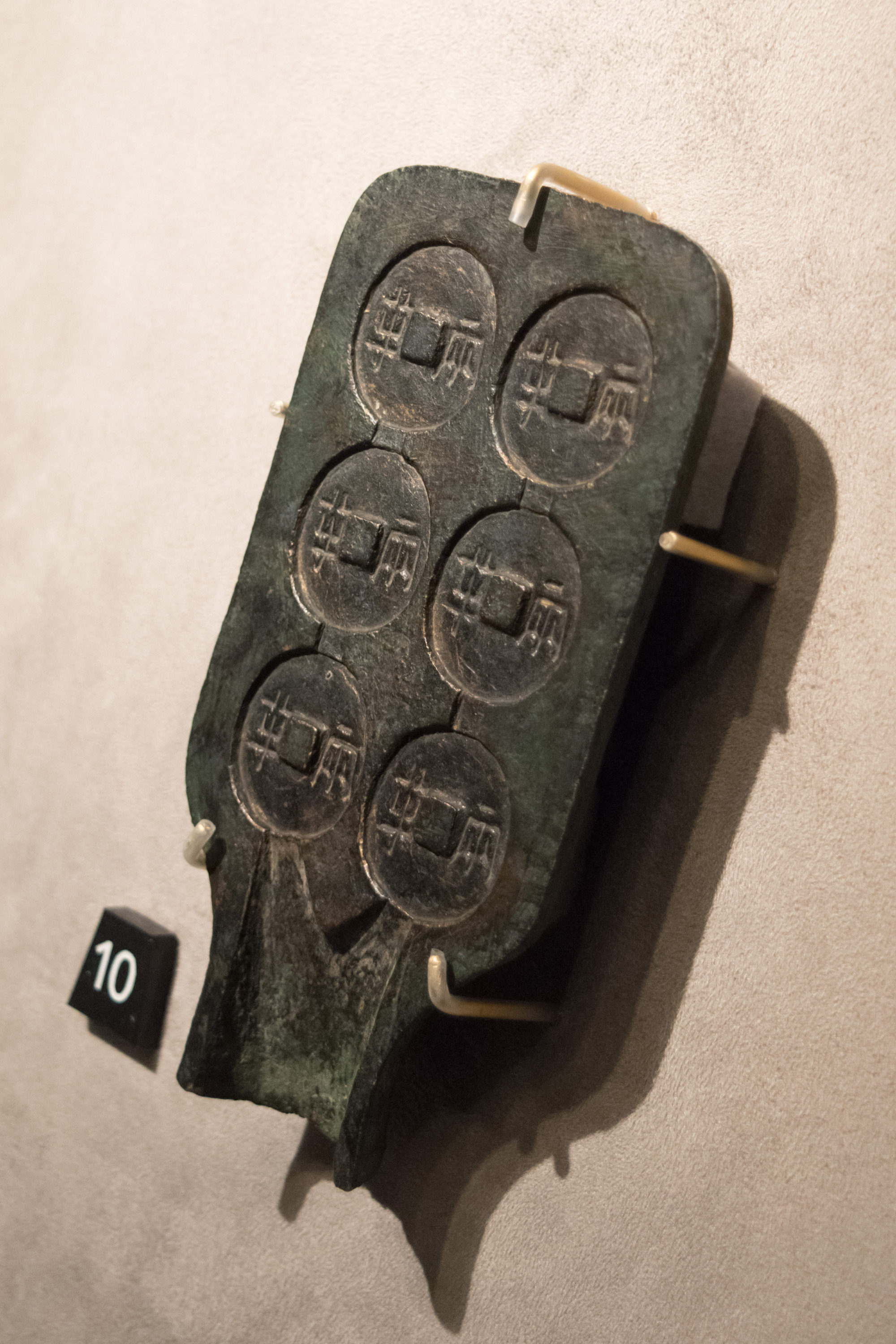
Bronze mould for minting Ban Liang coins, from an excavation in Qishan County, Baoji, Shaanxi.. The mould was used during the Warring States period (475–221 BC) by the State of Qin.

During the Zhou dynasty period, the method for casting coins consisted of first carving the individual characters of a coin together with its general outline into a mould made of either soapstone or clay. The casting process in these early moulds worked in a way that two mould-sections were placed together, then the core of the mould was placed into the top area, then the bronze smiths would pour molten metal into an opening that was formed by a cavity that was located in its centre. As this was done without using a prior model, early Chinese coinage tends to look very diverse, even from the same series of coins as these all were cast from different (and unrelated) moulds bearing the same inscriptions.

During the Han dynasty, to gain consistency in the circulating coinage, master bronze moulds were manufactured to be used as the basis for other cash moulds.

=== Later methods of manufacture ===
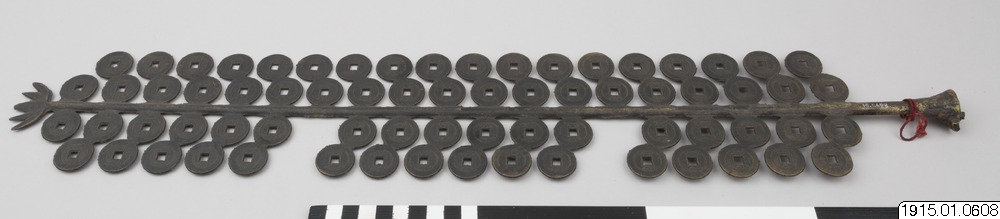
A "coin tree" used to make cash coins

From the 6th century and later, new "mother coins" (母錢; mǔ qián) were cast as the basis for coin production. These were engraved in generally easily manipulated metals such as tin. Coins were cast in sand moulds. Fine wet sand was placed in rectangles made from pear wood, and small amounts of coal and charcoal dust were added to refine the process, acting as a flux. The mother coins were placed on the sand, and another pear wood frame would be placed upon the mother coin. The molten metal was poured in through a separate entrance formed by placing a rod in the mould. This process would be repeated 15 times and then molten metal would be poured in. After the metal had cooled down, the "coin tree" (錢樹; qián shù) was extracted from the mould (which would be destroyed due to the process). The coins would be taken off the tree and placed on long square rods to have their edges rounded off, often for hundreds of coins simultaneously. After this process, the coins were strung together and brought into circulation.

In Korea cash coins are known as yeopjeon (葉錢 "leaf coins") because of the way that they resemble leaves on a branch when they were being cast in the mould.

From 1730 during the Qing dynasty, the mother coins were no longer carved separately but derived from "ancestor coins" (祖錢; zǔ qián). Eventually this resulted in greater uniformity among cast Chinese coinage from that period onwards. A single ancestor coin would be used to produce tens of thousands of mother coins; each of these in turn was used to manufacture tens of thousands of cash coins.

=== Machine-struck coinage ===
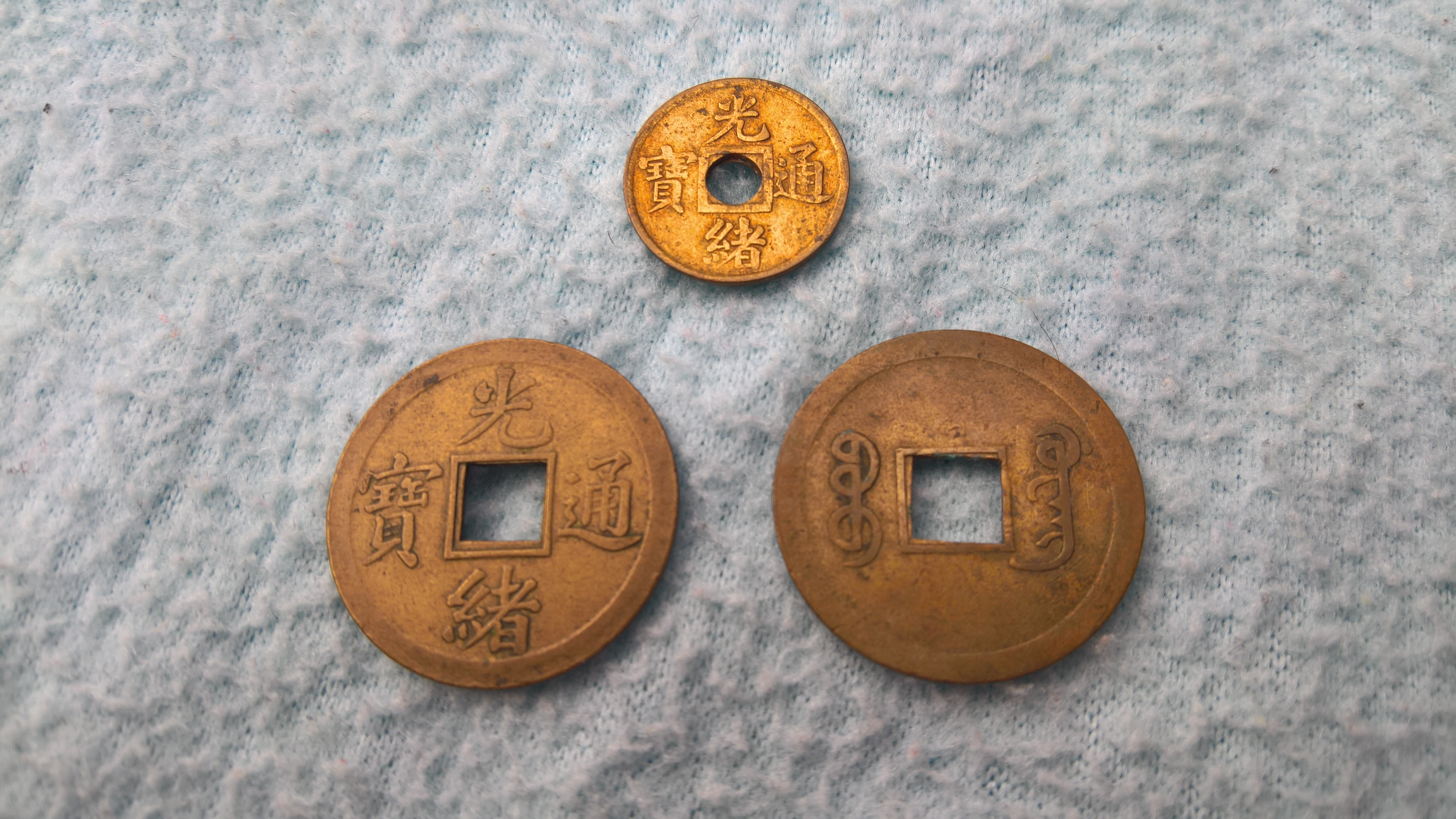
Machine-struck cash coins issued under the Guangxu Emperor in Guangzhou, Guangdong.

During the late Qing dynasty under the reign of the Guangxu Emperor in the mid 19th century the first machine-struck cash coins were produced, from 1889 a machine operated mint in Guangzhou, Guangdong opened where the majority of the machine-struck cash would be produced. Machine-made cash coins tend to be made from brass rather than from more pure copper as cast coins often were, and later the copper content of the alloy decreased while cheaper metals like lead and tin were used in larger quantities giving the coins a yellowish tint. Another effect of the contemporary copper shortages was that the Qing government started importing Korean 5 fun coins and overstruck them with "10 cash".

The production of machine-struck cash coins in Qing China ran contemporary with the production of machine-struck French Indochinese Nguyễn cash coins, but unlike in China milled cash coinage would eventually become popular in French Indochina with the Khải Định Thông Bảo (啓定通寶).

== Inscriptions and denominations ==
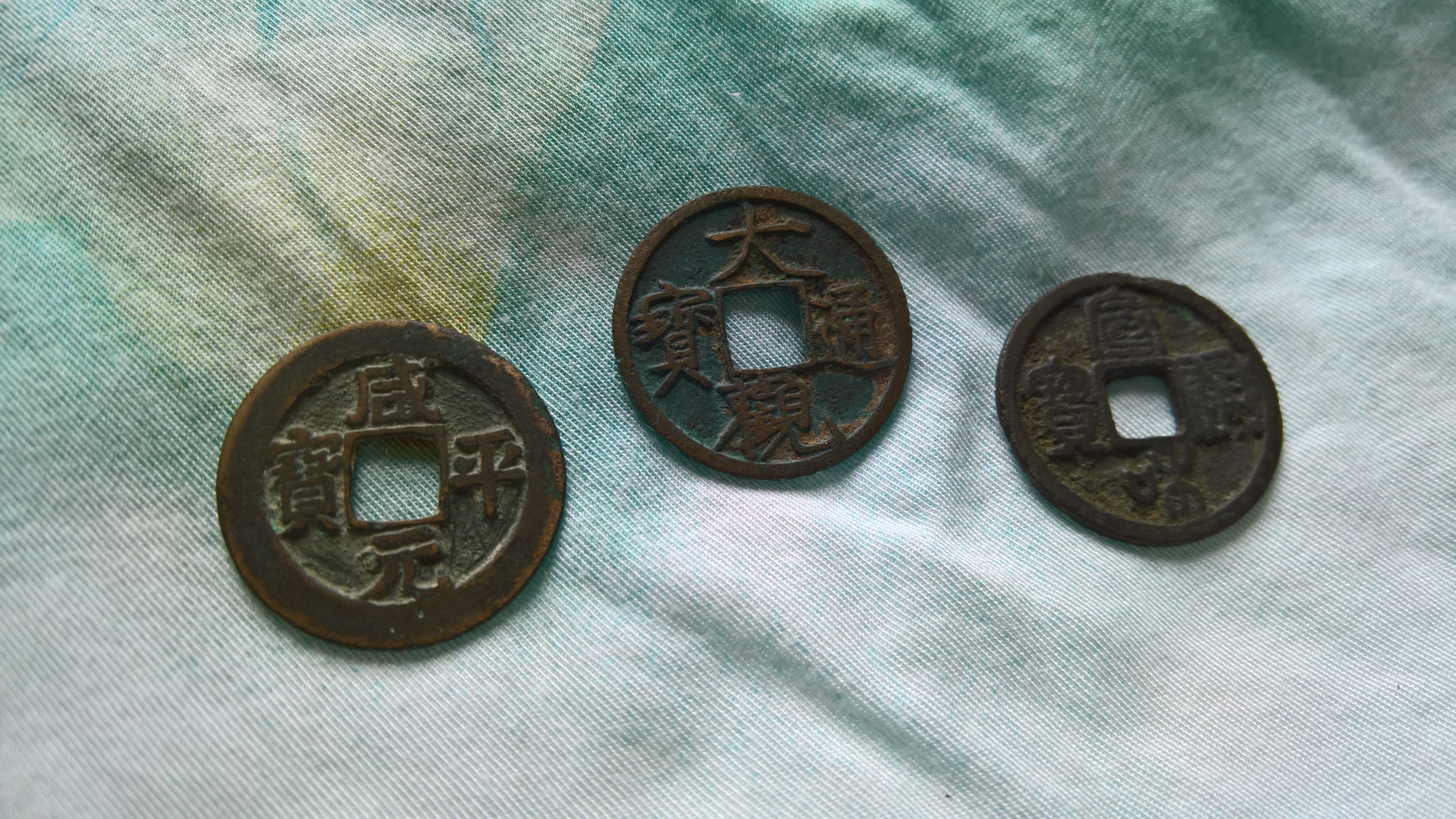
Three different cash coins from the Northern Song dynasty, the first coin reads clockwise while the others read top-bottom-right-left, the first and second coins are written in Regular script while the third coin is written in Seal script.

The earliest standard denominations of cash coins were theoretically based on the weight of the coin and were as follows:

- 100 grains of millet = 1 zhu (銖; zhū)
- 24 zhū = 1 tael (兩; liǎng)

The most common denominations were the ½ tael (半兩; bànliǎng) and the 5 zhū (五銖; wǔ zhū) coins, the latter being the most common coin denomination in Chinese history.

From the Zhou to the Tang dynasty the word quán (泉) was commonly used to refer to cash coins however this was not a real monetary unit but did appear in the inscriptions of several cash coins, in the State of Yan their cash coins were denominated in either huà (化) or huò (貨) with the Chinese character 化 being a simplified form of 貨 without the "貝". This character was often mistaken for dāo (刀) due to the fact that this early version of the character resembles it and knife money was used in Yan, however the origin of the term huò as a currency unit is because it means "to exchange" and could be interpreted as exchanging money for goods and services. From the Jin until the Tang dynasty the term wén (文), however the term wén which is often translated into English as cash kept being used as an accounting unit for banknotes and later on larger copper coins to measure how many cash coins it was worth.

In AD 666, a new system of weights came into effect with the zhū being replaced by the mace (qián) with 10 mace equal to one tael. The mace denominations were so ubiquitous that the Chinese word qián came to be used as the generic word for money. Other traditional Chinese units of measurement, smaller subdivisions of the tael, were also used as currency denominations for cash coins.

A great majority of cash coins had no denomination specifically designated but instead carried the issuing emperor's era name and a phrases such as tōngbǎo (通寶; 'general currency') or zhòngbǎo (重寶; 'heavy currency').

Coins of the Qing Dynasty (1644–1911) generally carried the era name of the emperor and tongbao on the obverse and the mint location where the coins were cast in Manchu and Chinese on the reverse.

=== Styles of calligraphy on cash coins ===
List of calligraphic styles and scripts on Chinese cash coins:

| Chinese calligraphy | | Non-Chinese scripts | |
| Calligraphic style | Example image | Script | Example image |
|---|---|---|---|
| Seal script (篆書) | | Kuśiññe script | |
| Clerical script (隸書) | | Old Uyghur alphabet | |
| Regular script (楷書) | | Khitan large script | |
| Running script (行書) | | Tangut script | |
| Grass script (草書) | | 'Phags-pa script | |
| Slender gold script (瘦金體) | | Manchu script | |
| Jade tendon seal script (玉筋篆) | | Arabic script | |

== Cash coins and superstitions ==
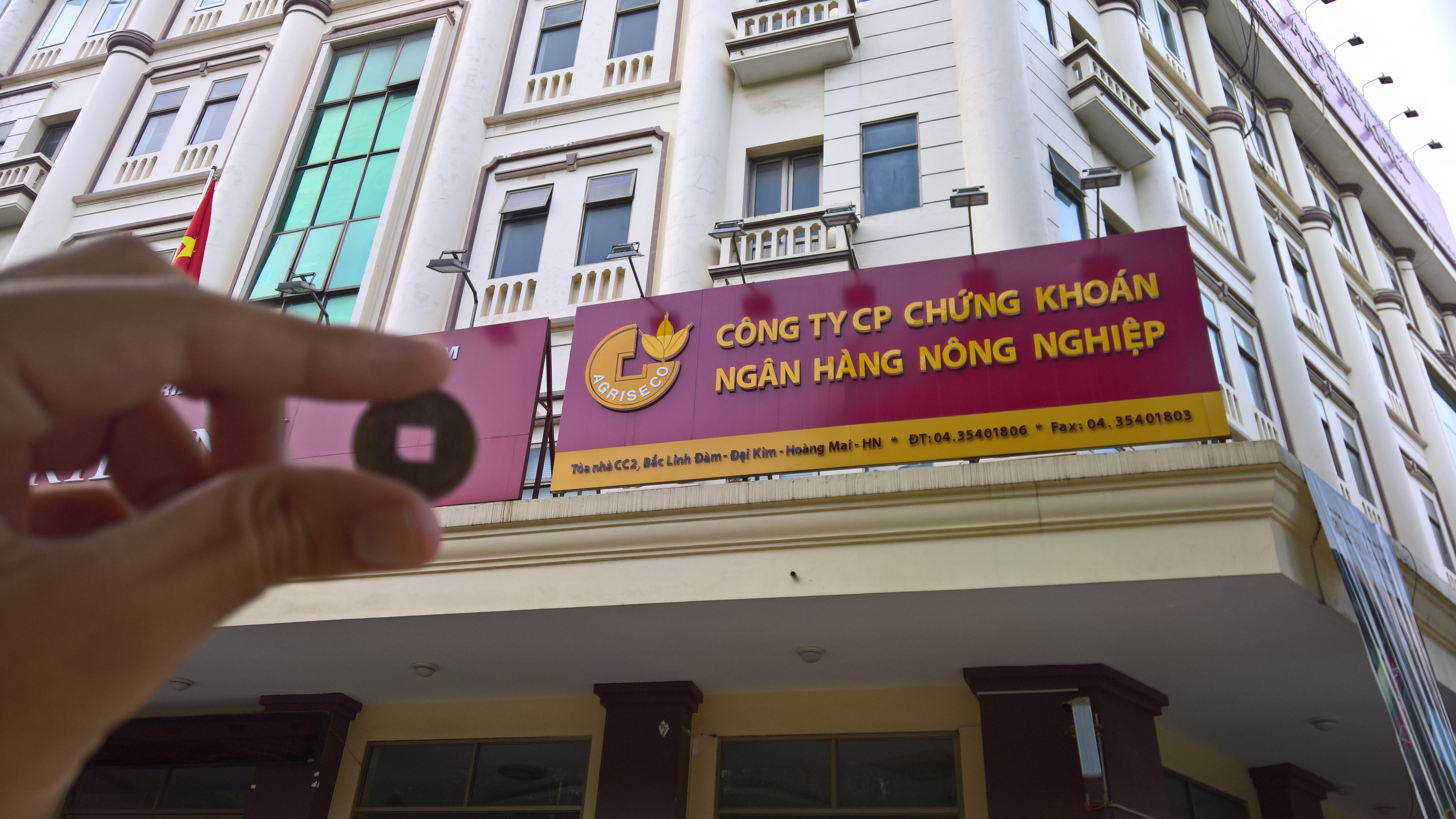
A cash coin used as part of the logo of Agriseco in the Hoàng Mai District, Hanoi, Vietnam

In imperial China cash coins were used for fortune telling, or divination, this would be done by first lighting incense to the effigy of a Chinese deity, and then casting three cash coins into a tortoise shell. The Chinese fortune telling process using cash coins involved the fortune teller counted the number of coins lying on their obverse or reverse sides, and how these coins scratched the shell, this process was repeated three or six times. After this a very intricate system based on the position of the coins with Bagua, and the five elements was used for divination, the Tang dynasty Kai Yuan Tong Bao (開元通寶) coin was the most preferred for this usage. Contemporary Chinese intelligentsia found the usage of cash coins for fortune-telling to be superior to any other methods.

Cash coins were also believed to hold "curing powers" in traditional Chinese medicine, one method of using cash coins for "medicine" was boiling them in water and letting the patient consume that water. Other than that they were also used as "medical tools" particularly in the guāshā (刮痧) method, which was used against diseases like cholera; this required the healer to scrape the patient's skin with cash coins in a process called "coining" as they believed that the pathogen remained stagnant underneath the patient's skin. Though in general any cash coin could be used in traditional Chinese medicine, the Kai Yuan Tong Bao was most preferred, and preferences were given for some specific coins for certain ailments E.g. the Zhou Yuan Tong Bao (周元通寶) was used against miscarriages.

In traditional Chinese medicine, several medicinal teas incorporate cash coins as ingredients. This usage of cash coins has been documented as early as the Eastern Jin dynasty, in China's first emergency medicine manual. Bronze cash coins are typically used to treat a person's auris externa, brass cash coins are often desired for their high zinc contents. And Vietnamese cash coins, which have the highest levels of zinc of any cash coins, were ground up into zinc powder that was mixed into either an aqueous solution or a type of ointment. The "tea" produced from these zinc cash coins would then for the treatment of the eyes, ears, and haemorrhoids or for topical use.

In modern times though no longer issued by any government, cash coins are believed to be symbols of good fortune and are considered good luck charms, for this reason some businesses hang Chinese cash coins as store signs for good luck and to allegedly avoid misfortune similar to how images of Caishen (the Chinese god of wealth) are used. Cash coins also hold a central place in feng shui where they are associated with an abundance of resources, personal wealth, money, and prosperity. Cash coins are featured on the logos of the Bank of China, and the China Construction Bank.

A common superstitious belief involving Chinese cash coins specifically based on their inscriptions are "the five emperor coins" (traditional Chinese: 五帝錢; simplified Chinese: 五帝钱; pinyin: wǔ dì qián), this refers to a set of Chinese cash coins issued by the first five emperors of the Qing dynasty (following their conquest of China in 1644). These cash coins are believed to have the power to ensure prosperity and to give protection from evil spirits because during the reign of these five emperors China was powerful and prosperous. Furthermore, the term "five emperors" (五帝) also alludes to the "Three Sovereigns and Five Emperors". A full set of "five emperor coins" consists of Chinese cash coins with the inscriptions Shunzhi Tongbao (順治通寶), Kangxi Tongbao (康熙通寶), Yongzheng Tongbao (雍正通寶), Qianlong Tongbao (乾隆通寶), and Jiaqing Tongbao (嘉慶通寶). These inscriptions are further seen as auspicious because Shunzhi (順治) translates as "to rule smoothly", Kangxi (康熙) means "Healthy and prosperous", "Yongzheng" (雍正) translates into "harmony and upright", the first Chinese character qián (乾) from Qianlong (乾隆) is a Mandarin Chinese homophonic pun with qián (錢) meaning "money", and Jiaqing (嘉慶) means "good and celebrate". Because of an archeological hoard of where Song dynasty cash coins were found in a Ming dynasty period tomb, it has been speculated by some archeologists that people during the Ming dynasty might have held similar beliefs with Song dynasty cash coins.

Another type of supernatural belief involving cash coins is to have them buried with a corpse for good luck as well as to provide protection to the grave or tomb from evil spirits, although this tradition doesn't exclusively involve cash coins as early 20th century silver coins bearing the face of Yuan Shikai, known outside of China as "Fatman" dollars (袁大頭; yuán dà tóu), have also been used for this purpose.

In Bali it is believed that dolls made from cash coins (or Uang kèpèng) strung together by cotton threads would guarantee that all the organs and body parts of the deceased will be in the right place during their reincarnation.

In North America, the Tlingit people of the Pacific Northwest (present-day Alaska and Canada) used Chinese cash coins for their body armour, which they believed would protect them from knife attacks and bullets. One contemporary Russian account from a battle with the Tlingits in 1792 states "bullets were useless against the Tlingit armour" - however this may speak to the inaccuracy of contemporary Russian smoothbore muskets than to the body armour and the Chinese cash coins sewn into the Tlingit armour. Other than for military purposes the Tlingit used Chinese cash coins on ceremonial robes.

== Stringing of cash coins ==
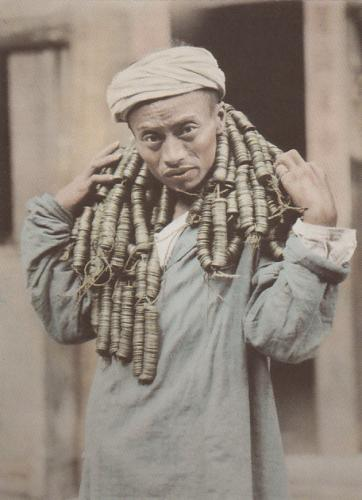
A Sichuanese man carrying 13,500 cash coins in strings on his shoulders (1917).

The square hole in the middle of cash coins served to allow for them to be strung together in strings of 1000 cash coins and valued at 1 tael of silver (but variants of regional standards as low as 500 cash coins per string also existed), 1000 coins strung together were referred to as a chuàn (串) or diào (吊) and were accepted by traders and merchants per string because counting the individual coins would cost too much time. Because the strings were often accepted without being checked for damaged coins and coins of inferior quality and copper-alloys these strings would eventually be accepted based on their nominal value rather than their weight, this system is comparable to that of a fiat currency. Because the counting and stringing together of cash coins was such a time consuming task people known as qiánpù (錢鋪) would string cash coins together in strings of 100 coins of which ten would form a single chuàn. The qiánpù would receive payment for their services in the form of taking a few cash coins from every string they composed, because of this a chuàn was more likely to consist of 990 coins rather than 1000 coins and because the profession of qiánpù had become a universally accepted practice these chuàns were often still nominally valued at 1000 cash coins. The number of coins in a single string was locally determined as in one district a string could consist of 980 cash coins, while in another district this could only be 965 cash coins, these numbers were based on the local salaries of the qiánpù. During the Qing dynasty the qiánpù would often search for older and rarer coins to sell these to coin collectors at a higher price.

Prior to the Song dynasty strings of cash coins were called guàn (貫), suǒ (索), or mín (緡), while during the Ming and Qing dynasties they were called chuàn (串) or diào (吊).

== Cash coins with flower (rosette) holes ==
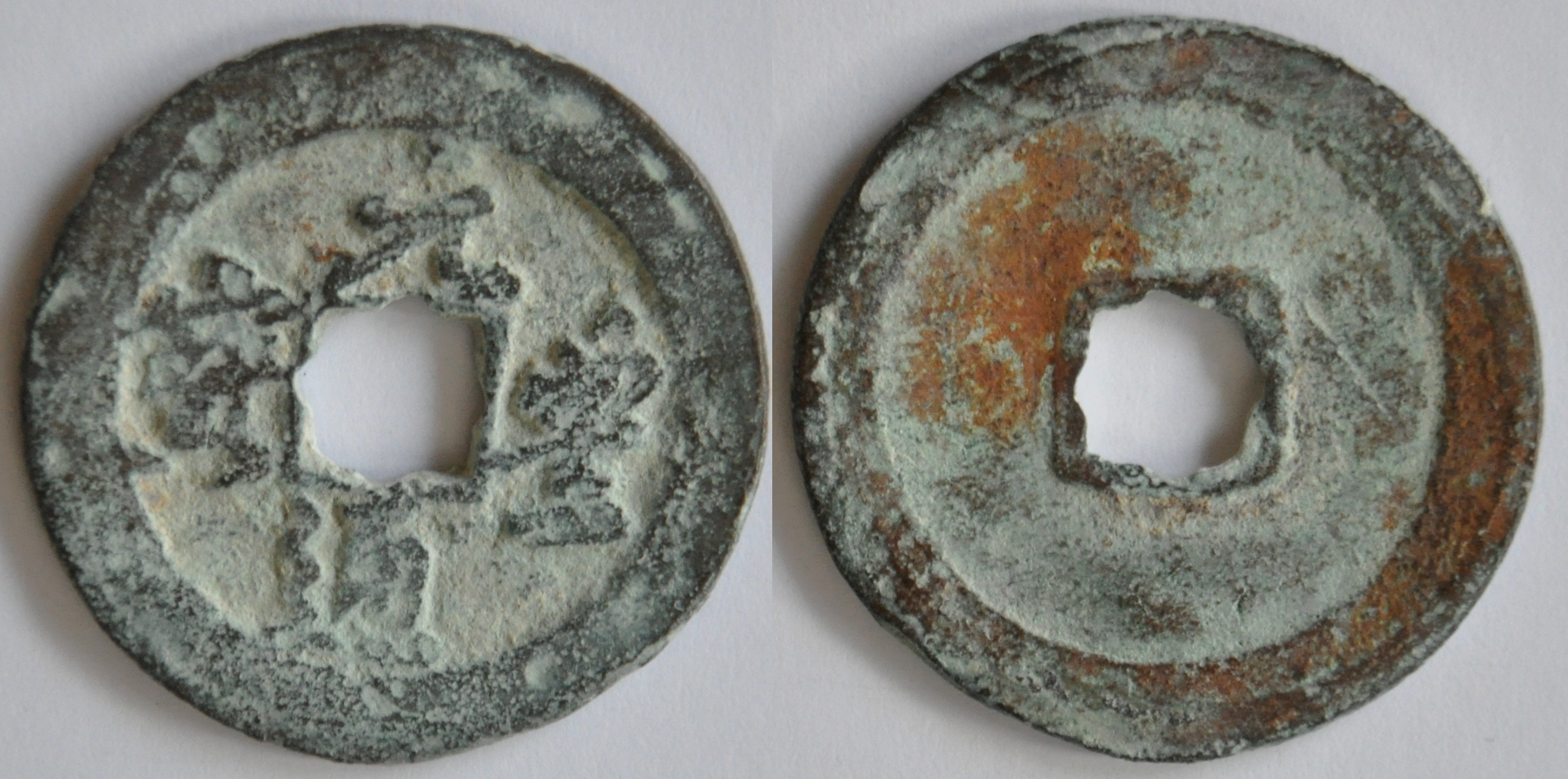
A Yuan Feng Tong Bao (元豐通寶) from the Northern Song dynasty with a "flower (or 'rosette') hole" in the middle

Chinese cash coins with flower (rosette) holes (traditional Chinese: 花穿錢; simplified Chinese: 花穿钱; pinyin: huā chuān qián) are a type of Chinese cash coin with an octagonal hole as opposed to a square one, they have a very long history possibly dating back to the first Ban Liang cash coins cast under the State of Qin or the Han dynasty.

Although Chinese cash coins kept their round shape with a square hole from the Warring States period until the early years of the Republic of China, under the various regimes that ruled during the long history of China the square hole in the middle experienced only minor modifications such as being slightly bigger, smaller, more elongated, shaped incorrectly, or sometimes being filled with a bit of excess metal left over from the casting process. However, for over 2000 years Chinese cash coins mostly kept their distinctive shape. During this period a relatively small number of Chinese cash coins were minted with what are termed "flower holes", "chestnut holes" or "rosette holes", these holes were octagonal but resembled the shape of flowers. If the shape of these holes were only hexagonal then they were referred to as "turtle shell hole coins" (龜甲穿錢), in some occidental sources they may be called "star holes" because they resemble stars. The exact origin and purpose of these variant holes is currently unknown but several hypotheses have been proposed by Chinese scholars. The traditional explanation for why these "flower holes" started appearing was accidental shifts of two halves of a prototype cash coin in clay, bronze, and stone moulds, these shifts would then produce the shape of the square hole to resemble multiple square holes placed on top of each other when the metal was poured in. A common criticism of this hypothesis is that if this were to happen then the inscription on the coin would also have to appear distorted, as well as any other marks that appeared on these cash coins, however this was not the case and the "flower holes" are equally distinctive as the square ones.

Under Wang Mang's Xin dynasty other than cash coins with "flower holes" also spade money with "flower holes" were cast. Under the reign of the Tang dynasty the number of Chinese cash coins with "flower holes" started to increase and circulated throughout the entire empire, concurrently the casting of Chinese cash coins was switched from using clay moulds to using bronze ones, however the earliest Kaiyuan Tongbao cash coins were still cast with clay moulds so the mould type alone cannot explain why these "flower holes" became increasingly common. As mother coins (母錢) were used to cast these coins which were always exact it indicates that these "flower holes" were added post-casting, the largest amount of known cash coins with "flower holes" have very prominent octagonal holes in the middle on both sides of the coin, comparatively their legends are usually as defined as they appear on "normal cash coins", for this reason the hypothesis that they were accidentally added is disproven. All sides of these coins (either octagonal with "flower holes" or hexagonal with "turtle shell holes") are clearly contained inside of the cash coin's central rim. After the casting of cash coins had shifted to using bronze moulds these coins would appear as if they were branches of a "coin tree" (錢樹) where they had to be broken off, all excess copper-alloy had to be manually chiseled or filed off from the central holes. It is suspected that the "flower holes" and "turtle shell holes" were produced during chiseling process, presumably while the employee of the manufacturing mint was doing the final details of the cash coins. As manually filing and chiseling cash coins was both an additional expense as well as time-consuming it is likely that the creation of "flower holes" and "turtle shell holes" was ordered by the manufacturer. However, as the quality of Tang and Song dynasty coinages was quite high it's unlikely that the supervisors would have allowed for a large number of these variant coins to be produced, pass quality control or be allowed to enter circulation. Cash coins with "flower holes" were produced in significant numbers by the Northern Song dynasty, Southern Song dynasty, and Khitan Liao dynasty. Until 1180 the Northern Song dynasty produced "matched cash coins" (對錢; duì qián) which were cash coins with identical inscriptions written in different styles of Chinese calligraphy, after these coins were superseded by cash coins that included the year of production on their reverse sides the practice of casting cash coins with "flower holes" also seems to have drastically decreased. Due to this one hypothesis states that "flower holes" were added to Chinese cash coins to signify a year or period of the year or possibly a location where a cash coin was produced. Only a few cash coins produced by the Jurchen-led Jin dynasty are known to have "flower holes".

During the Ming dynasty period "flower holes" were still (rarely) recoded in Hongwu Tongbao (洪武通寶) and Yongle Tongbao (永樂通寶) cash coins, with the Chongzhen Tongbao (崇禎通寶) series being the last recorded known cash coins to have "flower holes".

It is also possible that these "flower holes" and "turtle shell holes" functioned as Chinese numismatic charms, this is because the number 8 (八; bā) is a homophonic pun in Mandarin Chinese with "to prosper" or "wealth" (發財; fā cái), while the number 6 (六; liù) is a Mandarin Chinese homophonic pun with "prosperity" (祿; lù). Concurrently the Mandarin Chinese word for as "chestnut" (栗子; lì zi) as in the term "chestnut holes" could be a homophonic pun in Mandarin Chinese with the phrase "establishing sons" (立子; lì zi), which expresses a desire to produce male offspring.

The practice of creating cash coins with "flower holes" and "turtle shell holes" was also adopted by Japan, Korea, and Vietnam, however cash coins with these features are extremely rare in these countries despite using the same production techniques which further indicates that their addition was wholly intentional.

== Red cash coins ==
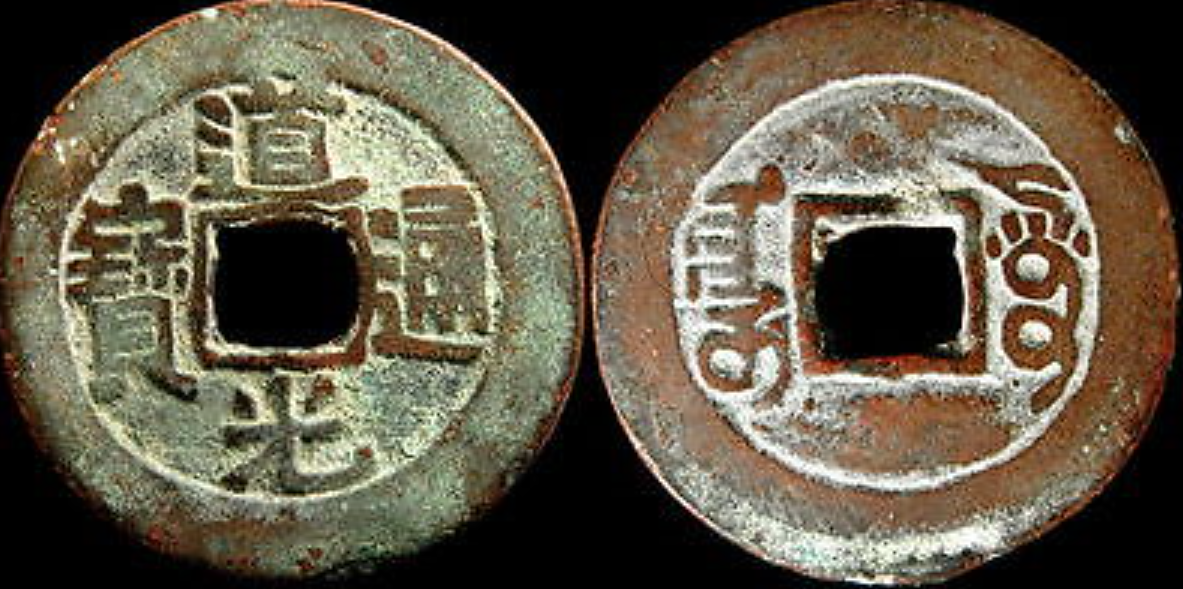
A "Red cash coin" produced by the Aksu mint under the reign of the Daoguang Emperor

"Red cash coins" (紅錢) are the cash coins produced in Xinjiang under Qing rule following the conquest of the Dzungar Khanate by the Manchus in 1757. While in Northern Xinjiang the monetary system of China proper was adopted in Southern Xinjiang where the pūl (ﭘول) coins of Dzungaria circulated earlier the pūl-system was continued but some of the old Dzungar pūl coins were melted down to make Qianlong Tongbao (乾隆通寶) cash coins, as pūl coins were usually around 98% copper, they tended to be very red in colour which gave the cash coins based on the pūl coins the nickname "red cash coins". In July 1759, General Zhao Hui petitioned to the Qianlong Emperor to reclaim the old pūl coins and use them as scrap for the production of new cash coins. These "red cash coins" had an official exchange rate with the pūl coins that remained in circulation of 1 "red cash" for 2 pūl coins. As Zhao Hui wanted the new cash coins to have the same weight as pūl coins, they weighed 2 qián and had both a higher width and thickness than regular cash coins. Red cash coins are also generally marked by their rather crude craftsmanship when compared to the cash coins of China proper. The edges of these coins are often not filed completely and the casting technique is often inaccurate or the inscriptions on them are deformed.

At the introduction of the red cash system in Southern Xinjiang in 1760, the exchange rate of standard cash (or "yellow cash") and "red cash" was set at 10 standard cash coins were worth 1 "red cash coin". During two or three subsequent years this exchange rate was decreased to 5:1. When used in the Northern or Eastern circuits of Xinjiang, the "red cash coins" were considered equal in value as the standard cash coins that circulated there. The areas where the Dzungar pūls had most circulated such as Yarkant, Hotan, and Kashgar were the sites of mints operated by the Qing government, as the official mint of the Dzungar Khanate was in the city of Yarkent the Qing used this mint to cast the new "red cash coins" and new mints were established in Aksu and Ili. As the Jiaqing Emperor ordered that 10% of all cash coins cast in Xinjiang should bear the inscription "Qianlong Tongbao" the majority of "red cash coins" with this inscription were actually produced after the Qianlong era as their production lasted until the fall of the Qing dynasty in 1911 making many of them hard to attribute.

== Non-copper-alloy cash coins ==
During most of their history the cast cash coins of China were predominantly made from bronze or other copper-alloys such as brass. However, other materials had at different times in Chinese history also been used for the manufacture of cash coins such as iron (see Tieqian), lead, silver, and gold. While silver and gold were also used for other currencies in Chinese history, as it has in most other cultures around the world, but also cowry shells, clay, bone, jade, iron, lead, tin, and bamboo (see Bamboo tally) were also materials that have been used for money at various points in Chinese history. Iron cash coins and lead cash coins were often used in cases when there was an insufficient supply of copper. 2 iron cash coins were usually worth only a single bronze cash coin. Because of oxidation, iron cash coins are rarely in very good condition today, especially if they were excavated.

In some cases the usage of certain types of materials to produce cash coins are only more recently discovered due to the lack of historical records mentioning them. For example, it has only been since more recent times that the fact that the Song dynasty had attempted to produce lead cash coins been discovered. Because of this almost no Chinese coin catalogues list their existence while they have mentioned in works such as the Meng Guohua: Guilin Faxian Qian Xi Hejin Qian. Zhongguo Qianbi No. 3. 1994 (Vol. 46.) which deal with the topic. Lead cash coins have only been produced at a few times in the monetary history of china, mainly during the Five dynasties and Ten kingdoms period. Because of how soft lead is, most lead cash coins that are found today tend to be very worn.

=== Non-copper-alloy metals used by time period ===
This table reflects current knowledge, but future archaeological research might reveal that other materials were used for cash coins in other periods of Chinese history.

Non-copper-alloy cash coins by time period
| Material used | Period(s) | Example image |
|---|---|---|
| Iron cash coins | Han dynasty, Three Kingdoms period, Northern and Southern dynasties period, Five dynasties and Ten kingdoms period, Song dynasty, Jin dynasty (1115–1234), Western Xia dynasty, Ming dynasty, and Qing dynasty. | |
| Lead cash coins | Zhou dynasty, Qin dynasty, Western Han dynasty, Tang dynasty, Five dynasties and Ten kingdoms period, Northern Song dynasty, and Qing dynasty. | |
| Clay cash coins | Five Dynasties and Ten Kingdoms period | |
| Silver cash coins | Ming dynasty | |
| Gold cash coins | Qin dynasty, Han dynasty, Tang dynasty, and Southern Song dynasty. | |

== Usage among overseas Chinese ==
It is generally thought that cash coins among the early overseas Chinese communities around the globe have primarily been used as ornaments, gaming pieces, talismans, and gifts to children, but their potential role as a type of alternative currency in Chinatowns and areas with concentrations of Chinese people has been proposed and disputed by multiple archeologists over the years. With modern scholars generally agreeing that they exclusively served non-currency functions and had gaming, religious, and cultural roles among the overseas Chinese.

"The coins used in playing fan t'an are those of the present dynasty, such as are now current in China and imported expressly for gambling purposes in large quantities."

- – The Gambling and Games of the Chinese in America by Stuart Culin (1891).

"played with Chinese cash, or brass coin, of which it takes in China one thousand to make a dollar. The pieces, however, are used, not as money, but as dice or counters"

- – 1858 San Francisco Bulletin article.

— Selected quotes from "The noncurrency functions of Chinese wen in America" by Marjorie Kleiger Akin (1 June 1992), Historical Archaeology.

Archeologists have also used Chinese cash coins found outside China to date various historical Chinese settlements. However, the cash coins recovered from these sites aren't exclusively Chinese, and archaeologists don't always recommend this method for dating. The cash coins recovered at archeological sites commonly include Song dynasty coins, Ming dynasty coins, and Qing dynasty coins. Not all Chinese cash coins found overseas were brought there by Chinese people, as they were inexpensive to purchase; before 1820, a foreign merchant could buy 1000 cash coins in China for one tael (36 grams) of silver; after 1845, this amount of silver could purchase 2200 or more cash coins. European merchants started purchasing cash coins in large quantities following the currency reforms enacted by the Ming dynasty between 1570 and 1580. During the many centuries of trade between Europe and China, cash coins would find their way to the New World and were occasionally used by Native American populations in adornments and clothing.

According to a 1979 article by Glenn J. Farris published in the journal of the Society for Historical Archaeology, the early overseas Chinese community in the United States used Chinese and Vietnamese cash coins as money among themselves while living in the United States. Farris noted this possibility has been suggested by a number of scholars who have analysed coins that were found in the western United States and western Canada. Farris claims that this hypothesis was validated by the finding of 141 Chinese cash coins, Vietnamese cash coins Hong Kong coins, and United States coins and tokens that were found at excavations in the Chinatown of Yreka, California, United States. Other scholars dispute these claims and have used a large number of both historical and contemporary evidence to debunk this.

Scholar Marjorie Kleiger Akin notes that it would have been impossible for Chinese cash coins to be used as money by overseas Chinese communities because "No object can circulate as money if it has a substantially greater value when removed from circulation and used for other purposes. The variety of uses for wen in North America and the numbers of the coins needed for some purposes have been underestimated in the past." Akin warned that archeologists should be more careful to describe unearthed cash coins in the United States as not underestimate how many cash coins were needed in the creation of various objects and that more attention should be given to determine whether cash coins were used as buttons, as basket decorations, as talismans, or joined together in red threads as misinterpreting their usage as pocket change may cause them to overlook other potential uses. She also notes that not all uses are identifiable and that careful examination of a pharmacy site might evidence their usage in traditional forms of medicine. Akin further cited a number of interviews with elderly Chinese residents of Locke who all claimed that they have never heard of anyone using cash coins as a type of currency there.

In a 1987 article entitled Chinese Coins Down Under: Their Role on the New Zealand Goldfields published in the Australian Journal of Historical Archaeology, researchers Neville A. Ritchie (regional archaeologist, Waikato, Department of Conservation) and Graham Stuart Park (director of the Auckland Institute and Museum) disputed the role of Chinese cash coins as money objects in any overseas Chinese community in the world. Ritchie and Park stated that their usage as a currency is "highly improbable" after analysing both archaeological and historical sources. They noted that Chinese cash coins among overseas communities were principally imported for gambling purposes, most notably as gaming counters.

Scholar Marjorie Kleiger Akin noted that Chinese cash coins are "a dramatic example of artifacts whose primary function changed completely when they changed cultural context", noting that rather than being used as currency, they started to fulfil a large number of non-monetary functions among the Chinese people living in the western regions of the North American continent. A large number of cash coins were transferred to the United States and Canada for a variety of talismanic and religious purposes. Akin states that a common talisman used by Chinese people living in the United States and Canada was the "coin-sword" which were commonly given to newlyweds to hang over the marriage bed as a means to insure bliss and harmony. These coin-swords are typically an approximate length of 35 cm to 50 cm and require a minimum of 50 coins to make, while the older, larger, and more elaborately decorated coin-swords would typically contain around 150 cash coins. Other ritualistic uses of cash coins include being used as funerary money, as their usage in Chinese funerals in the western United States has been reported as early as 1849.

Chinese cash coins were also commonly reported to be used by Chinese Americans in a number of gambling games, such as Fan-Tan. While the cash coins were being used as counters or markers, all bets were exclusively made using American money. Though their usage as markers or counters wasn't exclusively done so in betting games, as children used them in a similar manner in a variety of the game hopscotch, played in San Francisco as late as 1935.

Cash coins were also reported to have been used in decorative manners, for example 19th and early 20th century Chinese American mineworkers often strung them as keychains for either talismanic or sentimental reasons.

While there's no evidence for historical medicinal uses of Chinese cash coins among the overseas Chinese communities living in the United States, today their usage in the TCM practice of coining (Note: Alternative known as coin rubbing, known as Juasha in China, cao gio in Vietnam, koo kchall in Cambodia, kuong in Laos, and karok in Indonesia.) is well documented by both the Chinese American and Chinese Vietnamese American communities. The continued usage or cash coins in this practice is because suitably large US coins are not considered to be appropriate, as the edges of the coin must be smooth to avoid skin abrasion.

Scholar Julia G. Costello notes in the 2008 article The Luck of Third Street: Archaeology of Chinatown, San Bernardino, California that Asian cash coins are associated with one of 5 different uses: for gaming, as medicine, as talismans, as decorations, and in trade with Native Americans. She also notes that Vietnamese cash coins were unlikely to be traded or used as decorative items because the Chinese regarded them as "dirt money" due to their dark colour, which they perceived as unattractive.

== General glossary of Chinese cash coins ==
=== Casting process ===
- Mother coins (母錢), are model cash coins used in the casting process from which other cash coins were produced.
- Ancestor coins (祖錢), are model cash coins introduced in the Qing dynasty used in the casting process from which other mother coins were produced.
- Coin trees (錢樹), are the "tree-shaped" result of the casting process off of which the cash coins were taken to later be strung together.
- Mao (卯), a casting period, a pre-determined batch of cash coins to be cast.

=== Counterfeit and privately-issued cash coins ===
- Counterfeit cash coins (惡錢; 恶钱; È qián; 'Bad money') refers to illegally produced cash coins, often of inferior quality. Coin counterfeiting has been recorded as early as the Qin dynasty period and has negatively affected social stability and caused economic problems that would continue in later dynasties in Chinese history. The introduction and circulation of counterfeit cash coins onto the market caused inflation, which hindered economic development and caused a series of social problems throughout history. These illegally produced cash coins typically had reduced weights or were adulterated with lower-cost metals (such as iron, lead, etc.), reducing the copper content in the alloys relative to genuine cash coins.
- Siqian (私錢) or Sizhuqian (私鑄錢), refers to cash coins produced by private mints or forgers.

=== Design elements ===
- Crescent, a curved mark often found on the reverse side of cash coins, these are referred to as "moons" (月), further reading: "Han dynasty coinage § Dots, crescents, circles, numbers, counting rods, Chinese characters, and other symbols appearing on coins".
- Dot, a round mark often found on the reverse side of cash coins, these are referred to as "stars" (星).
- Dot and crescent, a combination of the above, these are known as a "pregnant star" (孕星).
- Huachuanqian (花穿錢), cash coins with octagonal holes, known as "flower (rosette) hole coins".
- Guijiachuan qian (龜甲穿錢), cash coins with hexagonal holes, known as "turtle shell hole coins".
- Gongshi Nuqian (公式女錢; 公式女钱; gōng shì nǚ qián), or "female coins", is a term used to refer to Wu Zhu cash coins without an outer rim.
- Jiaoqian (角錢; 角钱; jiǎo qián), or "corner coins", is a term used to refer to Wu Zhu cash coins with four oblique lines that extend outward from each corner of the square centre hole to the rim of the reverse side of the cash coin. In Mandarin Chinese, these cash coins are often referred to as si chu (四出). The word si (四) translates as "four" and the word chu (出) means "going out".
- Yushu Qian (禦書錢; 御书钱; yù shū qián), or "royally inscribed currency", is a term used to describe Song dynasty era cash coins which, according to legend, were inscribed by the Emperor of China himself. For example the Chunhua Yuanbao (淳化元寶) is said to have been inscribed by Emperor Taizong of Song.
- Si jue (四訣), four lines radiating outward from the four corners of the square centre hole which may or may not extend entirely to the rim of the reverse of a cash coin, these lines were exclusively included on some Song dynasty cash coins.

==== Inscriptions ====
- Liang (兩) and Zhu (銖), weight measures used as the main obverse inscriptions on ancient Chinese cash coins until the introduction of the Bao (寳), meaning "precious" or "treasure", inscription in the year 621.
- Tongbao (通寳), literally "circulating treasure", (Note: Alternatively translated as "circulating currency" or "universal currency".) is an inscription first introduced with the Kaiyuan Tongbao (開元通寳) series of cash coins during the Tang dynasty period in 621 and was used as the most common inscription on cash coins for more than 1300 years and occupies a dominant position in the monetary history of China. Prior to the introduction of the Kaiyuan Tongbao, cash coins typically featured the weight of the coin as (a part of) their inscription, but as cash coins were now valued based on government regulation rather than their weight as a form of commodity money this Inscription superseded the prior Wu Zhu (五銖) weight-based Inscription.
- Yuanbao (元寳), literally "inaugural treasure", "first treasure", "primal treasure", "original treasure", or "round treasure", originated as a misreading of the Inscription Kaiyuan Tongbao where the inscription was read clockwise as "Kaitong Yuanbao" (開通元寳). Due to a naming taboo the term "Yuanbao" was phased out from cash coin inscriptions as the founder of the Ming dynasty, Zhu Yuanzhang had the word "Yuan" (元) in his name. The term "Yuanbao" is also an alternative name for boat-shaped sycees.
- Zhongbao (重寳), literally "heavy treasure", an inscription typically used on high denomination cash coins, initially introduced in 758 with the Qianyuan Zhongbao (乾元重寳) nominally valued at 10 ordinary cash coins.
- Nianhao (年號), sometimes translated as "reign title" or "reign era", refers to the period title used by Chinese monarchs, these period titles typically consisted of an auspicious phrase (such as Immeasurable Splendour, Heavenly Favour, Abundant Happiness, or United Government) and was used to describe some or all years of the reign of an individual emperor. After the year 621, cash coins typically had 4 character obverse Inscriptions consisting of "[reign era] (Tong/Yuan/Zhong)bao", reading as "[年號](通/元/重)寳". Not all era names were considered to be useable for cash coin Inscriptions, causing them to substitute the nianhao with a dynastic title, consisting of the name of the dynasty in conjunction with a honorific adjective, for example Hanyuan Tongbao (漢元通寳) by the Southern Han dynasty, Tangguo Tongbao (唐國通寳) by the Southern Tang dynasty, and Huangsong Tongbao (皇宋通寳) during the Northern Song dynasty. From the Ming dynasty onwards, there was only a single nianhao used per reign, so the nianhao is often used synonymously as the name of the Emperor, for example Yongle Emperor, Jiajing Emperor, Kangxi Emperor, Jiaqing Emperor, Etc. Hence, only a single inscription was typically used during their reigns (Yongle Tongbao, Jiajing Tongbao, Kangxi Tongbao, Jiaqing Tongbao, Etc.).
- Matched cash coins (對錢, duì qián, 對品, duì pǐn, 和合錢, hé hé qián), is a term introduced during the Southern Tang and started being extensively used during the Northern Song dynasty where cash coins with the same weight, inscription, and denomination was simultaneously cast in different scripts such as regular script and seal script while all having the same legend.
- Shiqian (詩錢), a poem coin.
- Coastal province type, a common calligraphic style found on the locally produced cash coins of the Jiangsu, Jiangxi, Zhejiang, and Fujian from the Qianlong period onwards.

=== Materials and metals ===
==== Metal cash coins ====
- Jīnqián (金錢), gold cash coins (can also refer to other gold coins).
- Qiānqián (鉛錢), lead cash coins.
- Tóngqián (銅錢), copper-alloy cash coins, the most common type.
- Tiěqián (鐡錢) refers to cash coins made from iron.
- Xīnqián (鋅錢), or Baiqian qian (白鉛錢; Báiqiān qián), refers to zinc cash coins.
- Yínqián (銀錢), silver cash coins (can also refer to other silver coins).

==== Non-metal cash coins ====
- Niqian (traditional Chinese: 泥錢; simplified Chinese: 泥钱; pinyin: ní qián) refers to cash coins made out of clay, when the government of the You Zhou Autonomous Region (900–914) confiscated all bronze cash coins and buried them in a cave. Because of this the people had to rely on cash coins made out of clay while later poor-quality iron cash coins were issued.
- Tuqian (土錢), a name given to clay cash coins commonly found in tombs that were used as burial coins for the afterlife.

=== Sample and pattern coins ===
- Yang qian (樣錢), A sample or pattern coin.
- Banbu yang qian (頒布樣錢), an official pattern coin.
- Jincheng yang qian (進呈樣錢), "Present to the Emperor" sample coin.

=== Special and commemorative cash coins ===
- Jiyuan qian (記元錢), a cash coin cast to commemorate a new period title.
- Kai Lu Qian (開爐錢; 开炉钱; kāi lú qián), or "commemorative cash coins", were a special type of cash coin produced to commemorate the opening of a mint or a new furnace. The largest ever recorded of these cash coins, and also the largest and heaviest ancient Chinese coin ever found, was a giant Jiajing Tongbao (嘉靖通寶) cash coin produced for the opening of a mint in Dongchuan, Sichuan. This Kai Lu cash coin has a diameter of 57.8 centimeters (or 22.8 inches), a thickness of 3.7 centimeters (or 1.5 inches), and it has a weight of 41.5 kilograms (or 91.5 pounds). On June 27, 1990, the Quality Inspection Section of the Huize County Lead and Zinc Mine Archives (会泽县的铅锌矿档案馆; 會澤縣的鉛鋅礦檔案館; huì zé xiàn de qiān xīn kuàng dàng àn guǎn), where the cash coin is on display, conducted a sampling and analysis of the coin, conducted an assay and concluded that the coin had a composition of 90. 81% copper, 0. 584% aluminum, 0. 532% zinc, and 3% iron. In the year 2002 it was added to the Guinness World Records as the largest coin.
- Five Metal Value Ten coins are Chinese cash coins that were issued by the Ministry of Revenue made from an alloy of tin, iron, copper, silver, and gold. They contain the obverse inscriptions Tongzhi Zhongbao (同治重寶) or Guangxu Zhongbao (光緒重寶) and are all based on 10 wén Daqian. These special cash coins notably contain the mint marks of Fujian, Guangdong, Guangxi, Guizhou, Ili, Jiangsu, Jiangxi, Hubei, Hunan, Shanxi, Shaanxi, Sichuan, Yunnan, Zhejiang, and Zhili despite no Daqian from these periods being produced at any of these mints. These special cash coins were created to serve as a new year's present.
- Tianxia Taiping coins (天下太平錢) are Chinese cash coins that were used for presentation at the Palace of Ancestral Worship. They were primarily used during the holidays, such as the birthdays of the reigning emperor or empress as well during as the Chinese New Year. These coins contain the reign titles Qianlong, Jiaqing, Daoguang, Xianfeng, Tongzhi, Guangxu, or Xuantong with "Tongbao" (通寶), or rarely "Zhongbao" (重寶), in their obverse inscription and the reverse inscription "Tianxia Taiping" (天下太平). These special cash coins were wrapped inside of a piece of rectangular cloth and every time that an Emperor died (or "ascended to his ancestors") the coins were replaced with new reign titles. Some Tianxia Taiping cash coins were manufactured by the Ministry of Revenue while others were produced by private mints. Palace issues tend to be larger than circulation cash coins with the same inscriptions.
- Neiting qian (內庭錢), a palace cash coin.

=== Types of cash coins ===
Pre-Ming

- Huanqian (圜錢), or Huanjin (圜金), refers to the round coins issued during the Warring States period and the Qin dynasty. This term was used to differentiate these coins from other shapes of coins, such as the spade coins and knife coins.
- Xiaoping Qian (小平錢) refers to the smallest and most common cash coins, they usually had a diameter of about 2.4–2.5 cm and weights between 3–4 grams.
- Huaqian (花錢, "Flower coin"), charms, amulets, and talismans that often resemble cash coins.
- Cinnabar money (traditional Chinese: 硃砂銅錢; simplified Chinese: 朱砂铜钱; pinyin: Zhūshā tóngqián) refers to cash coins and cash coin amulets that have been artificially made to resemble cinnabar rust money through the application of cinnabar dye. Ancient Chinese people believed that making cash coins into a bright red colour played a role in warding off evil spirits by hanging it on a beam in the house or wearing such coins around their waist. Cinnabar rust money refers to old cash coins which had oxidated in an alkaline environment (pH 7-10) and appeared red in colour, this is because the soil reduced substances such as organic sugars to produce cuprous oxide (Cu2O) which is dark red, and also lead red (Pb_{3}O_{4}). This occurs when local corrosion and electrochemical corrosion will also occur, producing red and green rust forming small pinholes (referred to as "bone rust"). Cash coins typically first rust green before they turn red into cinnabar rust money. This is because cash coins until the mid-Ming dynasty period onwards most cash coins were made from bronze, though later cash coins were mostly made from brass causing them to oxidise differently, but because the old superstitions still applied people would manually apply cinnabar dye to make them appear red.
- Bingqian (餅錢, "biscuit coins" or "cake coins"), is a term used by modern Chinese and Taiwanese coin collectors to refer to cash coins that have extremely broad outer rims and are extremely thick and heavy. These cash coins were produced under Emperor Zhenzong during the Song dynasty and bear the inscriptions Xianping Yuanbao (咸平元寶) and Xiangfu Yuanbao (祥符元寶), respectively. Bingqian can range from being 26.5 millimeters in diameter and weighing 10.68 grams to being 66 millimeters in diameter.
- Gong Yang Qian (traditional Chinese: 供養錢; simplified Chinese: 供养钱; pinyin: gōng yǎng qián), variously translated as "temple coins" or "offering coins", were a type of alternative currency that resembled Chinese cash coins that circulated during the Mongol Yuan dynasty period. The Yuan dynasty emperors (or khagans) were supporters of Buddhism, which meant that the Buddhist temples tended to receive official government support. During this period the larger Buddhist temples in China were able to cast bronze Buddha statues and make other religious artifacts which also meant that it was easy for them to also cast these special kind of cash coins which could then be used by faithful adherents of Buddhism as offerings to Buddha. In general, these temple coins tend to be much smaller and crudely made compared to earlier and later Chinese cash coins. However, because these temple coins, due to their copper content, still had intrinsic value, they would sometimes serve as an alternative currency in China, this would particularly happen during difficult economic times when the Jiaochao paper money issued by the Mongol government was no longer considered to be of any value.
- Guqian (古錢, "ancient cash") or Guquan (古泉 ), refers to cash coins (real or fake) produced by previous dynasties, these at certain times were considered to be legal tender if the current Chinese government didn't produce enough cash coins to meet market demand.

Ming dynasty

- Zhiqian (制錢, "Standard cash coins"), a term used the Ming and Qing dynasties to refer to copper-alloy cash coins produced by the imperial mints according to the standards which were fixed by the central government.
- Jiuqian (舊錢), a term used during the Ming and Qing dynasties to refer to Song dynasty era cash coins that were still in circulation.
- Yangqian (样錢, "Model coin"), also known as Beiqian (北錢, "Northern coin"), is a term used during the Ming dynasty to refer to full weight (1 qián) and fine quality which were delivered to Beijing as seigniorage revenue.
- Fengqian (俸錢, "Stipend coin"), is a term used during the Ming dynasty to refer to second rate cash coins that had a weight of 0.9 qián and were distributed through the salaries of government officials and emoluments.
- Shangqian (賞錢, "Tip money"), is a term used during the Ming dynasty to refer to cash coins that were small, thin, and very fragile (comparable to Sizhuqian) that were used to pay the wages of employees of the imperial government (including the mint workers themselves) and was one of the most commonly circulating types of cash coins during the Ming dynasty among the general population.
- Woqian (倭錢, "Japanese cash"), refers to Japanese cash coins that entered China during the late Ming and early Qing dynasties, the Imperial Chinese court eventually prohibited them. These are sometimes discovered in China among Chinese cash coins.
- Xuanbian qian (鏇邊錢), literally "lathed-rim cash coins", was a popular name (folk name) used during the Ming dynasty period to refer to cash coins produced in Yunnan and in Beijing, at the Baoyuanju Mint (寶源局), under the reign of the Jiajing Emperor that were polished using lathes known as xuàn chē (鏇車). These cash coins were stable, had a yellowish colour that contemporary sources describe as "beautiful", and round and smooth rims.
- Huoqi qian (火漆錢), literally "fire lacquer coins", refers to a Ming dynasty period type of cash coins that were produced by having a special lacquer applied to the coins during finishing aspect of the manufacturing process. The only evidence of their existence is mentioned in the Tiangong Kaiwu. A number of surviving late Ming dynasty cash coins are found to have certain amounts of black lacquer substance that is found at the lower parts between characters. This lacquer tends to make the design of the coins look a bit cleaner and was possibly only applied to enhance the beauty of the coins and as an anti-counterfeiting measure. As the alloys of Huoqi qian was different from unlacquered cash coins in circulation at the time, the lacquer may have served as a coating that protected the coin from corrosion. During circulation, the lacquer on the raised parts of the coin would have likely rubbed off.

Qing dynasty

- Guangbei qian (光背錢), is a Qing dynasty term that refers to Shunzhi Tongbao (順治通寳) cash coins with no reverse inscriptions including mint marks.
- Yiliqian (一厘錢, "one-cash coin"), referred to as Zheyinqian (折銀錢, "conversion coins") by Chinese numismatists, (Note: Chinese numismatists use the term "conversion coins" because of their official fixed value compared with silver.) is a term used to designate Shunzhi Tongbao cash coins produced from the year 1653 that had the inscription "一厘" on the left to the square centre hole on their reverse sides, this inscription indicates that the nominal value of the cash coin corresponded to 0.001 tael of silver (1 li (釐 or 厘, "cash"), as a weight). This would mean that the official government conversation rate was set as zhé yín yì lí qián (折銀一厘錢), which was proof that silver was of continuing importance as a currency of account. Similar cash coins with this reverse inscription were also being produced by some rulers of the Southern Ming dynasty.
- Xiaoqian (小錢, "small cash") or Qingqian (輕錢), is a Qing dynasty era term that refers to lightweight cash coins created from 1702 that had a weight of 0.7 qián, these coins all disappeared from circulation around the middle of the 18th century.
- Zhongqian (重錢, "full-weight cash" or "heavy cash"), refers to cash coins produced from 1702 with a weight of 1.4 qián and were 1/1000 of a tael of silver.
- Huangqian (黃錢, "yellow cash"), a term used to refer to early Qing dynasty era cash coins that didn't contain any tin.
- Qingqian (青錢, "green cash"), is a term used to refer to Qing dynasty era cash coins produced from 1740 where 2% tin was added to the alloy, however despite being called "green cash" it looked indistinguishable from "yellow cash".
- Daqian (大錢, "Big money"), cash coins with a nominal value of 4 wén or higher. This term was used in the Qing dynasty from the Xianfeng period onwards.

=== Units of account ===
- Cash (文), nominally 1 cash coin.
- Diao (吊), a string of 100 or 500 cash coins.
- Chuan (串), a string of 1000 cash coins.
- Changqian (長錢) refers to the regular cash coin system used across China where 1000 cash coins make up a single string (串).
- Dongqian (東錢, "Eastern cash"), an exchange rate used for cash coins in the Fengtian province, where only 160 cash coins make up a string.
- Jingqian (京錢, "metropolitan cash") or Zhongqian (中錢), an exchange rate used in the capital city of Beijing, the Jingqian system allowed a nominal debt of 2 wén (文) could be paid out using only one physical cash coins instead of two, in this system a string of Beijing cash coins (吊) required only 500 cash coins as opposed to the majority of China which used 1000 cash coins for a string (串).
- Kuping Qian (庫平錢), refers to a unit that was part of the official standardisation of the Chinese monetary system during the late Qing period by the imperial treasury to create a decimal system in which 1 Kuping Qian was 1/1000 of a Kuping tael.

== See also ==
- History of Chinese currency
- Jiaozi (currency), the earliest paper money
- Economic history of China (pre-1911)
- Economic history of China (1912–1949)

=== Currencies based on the Chinese cash ===
- Brunei pitis
- Cash coins in Indonesia
- Hong Kong one-mil coin
- Japanese mon (currency)
- Korean mun
- Kucha coinage
- Ryukyuan mon
- Vietnamese đồng
- Kelantan keping
- Terengganu keping
