= Mother coin =

Asian coins used to cast more coins

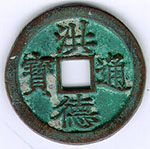
A Hồng Đức Thông Bảo (洪德通寶) mother coin, from this coin other Hồng Đức Thông Bảo cash coins were cast during the Later Lê dynasty.

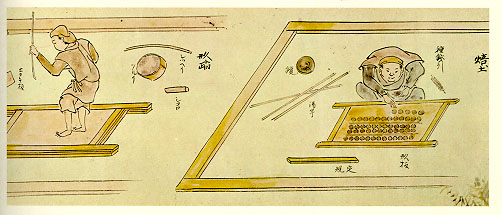
An image from an Edo period scroll produced in 1728 of a man pressing mother coins into a sand mould to produce the imprints for cash coins in the mint of the Sendai Domain.

Mother coins (traditional Chinese: 母錢; simplified Chinese: 母钱; pinyin: mǔ qián), alternatively known as seed coins, matrix coins, or model coins (樣錢), were coins used during the early stages of the casting process to produce Chinese, Japanese, Korean, Ryukyuan, and Vietnamese cash coins. As cash coins were produced using sand casting mother coins were first produced to form the basis for all subsequent cash coins to be released into circulation. Under the Han dynasty in China mints started producing cash coins using bronze master moulds to solve inconsistencies in circulating coins, this only worked partially and by the sixth century mother coins were introduced to solve these inconsistencies almost completely. The Japanese adopted the usage of mother coins in the 600s and they were used to manufacture cast Japanese coins until the Meiji period. The mother coin was initially prepared by engraving a pattern with the legend of the cash coin which had to be manufactured. In the manufacturing process mother coins were used to impress the design in moulds which were made from easily worked metals such as tin and these moulds were then placed in a rectangular frame made from pear wood filled with fine wet sand, possibly mixed with clay, and enhanced with either charcoal or coal dust to allow for the molten metal to smoothly flow through, this frame would act as a layer that separates the two parts of the coin moulds. The mother coin was recovered by the people who cast the coins and was placed on top of the second frame and the aforementioned process was repeated until fifteen layers of moulds had formed based on this single mother coin. After cooling down a "coin tree" (錢樹) or long metallic stick with the freshly minted cash coins attached in the shape of "branches" would be extracted from the mould and these coins could be broken off and if necessary had their square holes chiseled clean, after this the coins were placed on a long metal rod to simultaneously remove the rough edges for hundreds of coins and then these cash coins could be strung together and enter circulation.

The Sangpyeong Tongbo (常平通寶) cash coins were known as yeopjeon (葉錢, "leaf coins") because of the way that cash coins resembled leaves on a branch when they were being cast in the mould.

The introduction and subsequent usage of mother coins in the casting process proved to be paramount in controlling the quality of the cash coins. Only minor differences between mother coins remained, as the carver was very skilled. If mother coins had even the slightest error than this error would be visible on every cash coin that would be produced from it, which is why mother coins with any imperfections were quickly withdrawn from the production process before impacting many coins meant for circulation. Due to the high quality control mother coins with deformities are almost never found.

== History ==
Before modern industrial patterns were introduced into almost all fields of production, coin mints can be considered to be an outstanding example of an early form of mass production of attempting to create identical objects, or those as standardised and as similar to each other as possible. Therefore, it wasn't only just the technological knowledge and the techniques that were applied which mattered, but also the general organisation and especially the division of labour that were crucially regarded of being of paramount importance to the assessment of both the efficiency and quality of the work of coin mints. It wasn't until the Song dynasty period that contemporary sources started to actively record the works of coin mints to give insights into these early instances of mass production.

The Song dynasty period saw an especially high demand for cash coins leading to not only bronze cash coins but also iron cash coins being mass produced for the market. During this period government operated coin mints were generally divided into 2 types, namely bronze cash coin mints and iron cash coins mints. However, this division wasn't absolute and at times bronze cash coin mints would produce iron cash coins. During the Northern Song dynasty period a scarce number of sources started providing written evidence for both the usage of the "sand casting method" (翻砂法) and the application of mother coins to this process. The Song huiyao jigao (宋會要輯稿) provides the earliest known evidence for the application of mother coins into the production process of cash coins.

“…, in the first year of the Daguan reign-period (1107), the Yongfeng mint (永豐監) cast by turning the cash coins (小平錢, xiaopingqian) with the imperial calligraphy saying ‘Daguan tongbao’ (大觀通寶) on them.”

— "Criminal Law", Song huiyao jigao (宋會要輯稿).

The History of Song records that during the year Daguan 1 (1107) that the emperor of the Song dynasty would distribute both "cash coin samples" (錢式) and mother coins to all cash coin producing circuits. Later the Rhapsody of the Great Smelting (大冶賦) published in the year 1210 records a poem that completely details the cash coin manufacturing process detailing its use of mother coins. Both of these works explicitly mentioning how mother coins were applied in the sand casting method at the time and how they were used to form the patterns for cash coins in the sand moulds.

Notably, the Rhapsody of the Great Smelting records the sentence "scrubbing the cash coins with grain chaff", which wouldn't be mentioned again in the historical records 689 years later in the Qing dynasty period 1899 book A Survey of Casting Coins (鑄錢述略), which indicated the long continued usage of this method.

== Types of mother coins ==
There were two different types of mother coins, namely engraved mother coins and cast mother ones. Engraved mother coins were typically made of materials such as wood, tin, copper, or ivory, while cast mother coins were exclusively made of copper or tin. The usage of mother coins varied in different dynasties and time periods, while the changes in the rest of the sand casting technique of cash coin production itself were rather marginal.

=== Wax mother coins ===
Under the Sui and Tang dynasties mother coins reached their definite form and were produced in moulds engraved by ancestor coins, however during this same period a casting technique called "the lost wax method" was used to cast for example Kaiyuan Tongbao cash coins, in this method mother coins made from wax rather than metal were used, these mother coins were produced in large quantities because they were very cheap to make, unlike metal mother coins these wax mother coins stayed in the clay moulds and when the mould heated up they would melt away leaving a cavity for the molten metal to pour into forming the coins. This technique was also used for casting other bronze items however it was only used for casting coinage during the Sui and Tang dynasties and its sudden discontinuation pointed out to the fact that it was probably inefficient for mass-producing small items such as coins.

== Ancestor coins ==
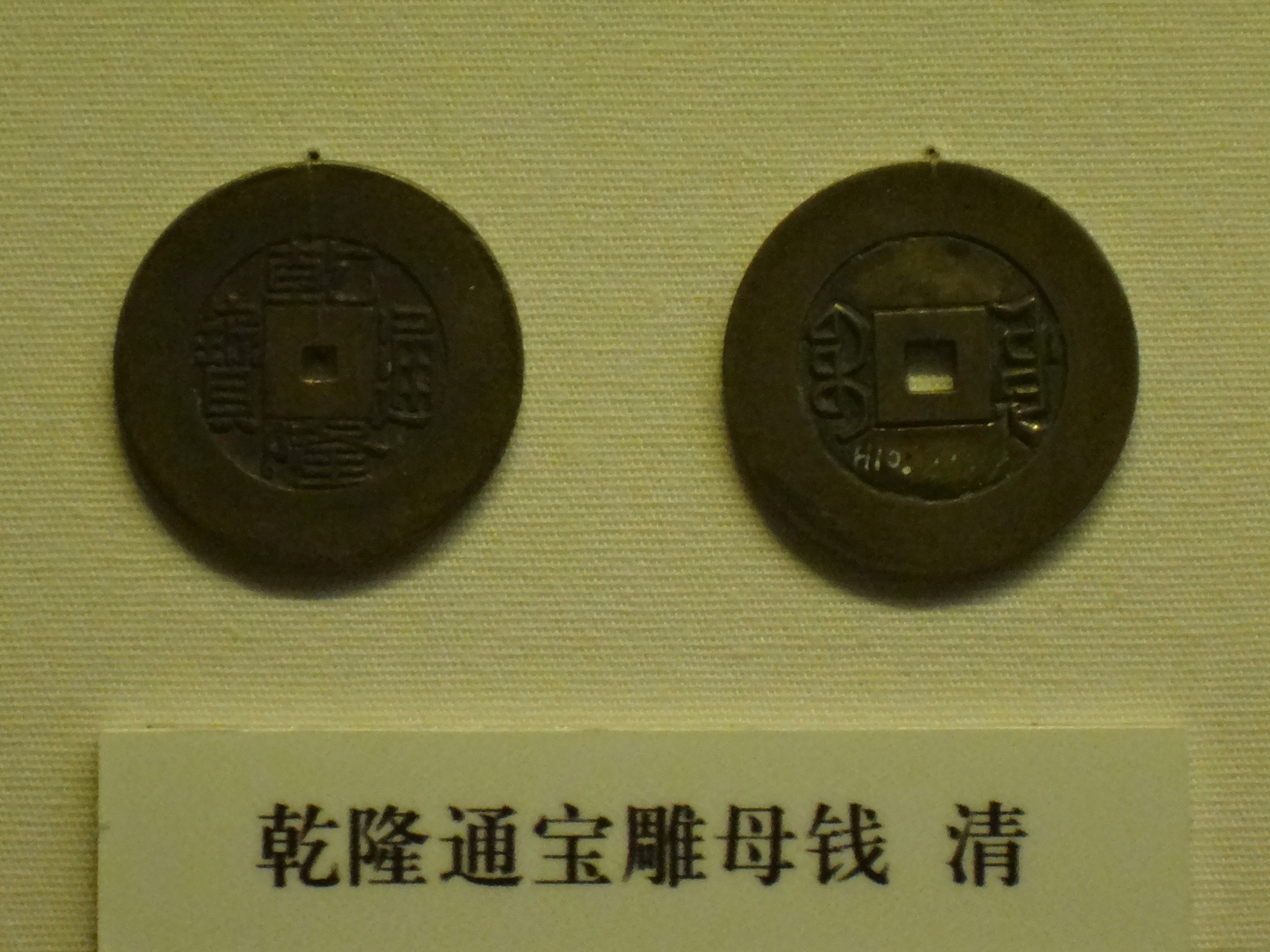
A Qianlong Tongbao (乾隆通寶) ancestor coin produced during the Qing dynasty, on display at the National Museum of China.

Ancestor coins (traditional Chinese: 祖錢; simplified Chinese: 祖钱; pinyin: zǔ qián), also known as engraved mother coins (Chinese: 雕母; pinyin: diāo mǔ), master cash, or progenitor coins, were introduced around 1730 in middle of the eighteenth century to improve the quality control of mother coins, these ancestor coins were used to cast more mother coins and from a single ancestor thousands of mother coins could be cast. The production process of making mother coins with ancestor coins was the same as it was for the casting of circulation coins from mother coins, however these coins were usually only produced for a new reign title, when preparing to cast new cash coins with new inscriptions for a recently ascended emperor, a mint would first engrave an ancestor coin out of fine brass which would form the basis for mother coins. The introduction of ancestor coins under the Manchu Qing dynasty lead to all mints having more consistently produced coinages and smaller variations between the coins produced by separate mints in both inscription (or legend) as well as in quality.

== Rare specimens ==
- On November 30, 2014, a Qixiang Tongbao (祺祥重寶) engraved mother coin was sold at an auction in the city of Beijing for $129,843 (which at the time was worth 808,500 yuan).

== Iutsushi ==
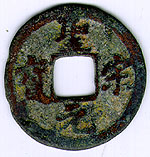
A Thánh Tống Nguyên Bảo (聖宋元寶) which was cast by using a circulating cash coin as a mother coin.

Iutsushi (Japanese: 鋳写し) is a Japanese term that could be translated as "to cast a copy from", this refers to a technique where regular circulating cash coins were used as mother coins, this was a very common practice in Japan until the seventeenth century and mostly Chinese cash coins from the Song and Ming dynasties were used. Outside of Japan this technique was also largely used to produce counterfeit currency by illegal Chinese and private Vietnamese mints, as the cash coins produced by using the Iutsushi technique were less crisp than their mother coins, often have smooth reverses, and the fact that these coins shrunk after metal had cooled down, Iutsushi coins are also diminutive in size compared to the original circulating coins and the inscriptions are also inferior in quality as they display more softer and quite blurry. For these reasons the cash coins produced using this technique were among the cash coins known as Bitasen (鐚銭) or bad metal coins in Japan.

Due to Iutsushi, it is often very hard to distinguish Japanese Bitasen from Chinese counterfeit cash coins as well as privately produced cash coins from Vietnam as many of these used the same inscriptions; it is not uncommon for there to be large variations in both the quality and metal content of original coins that have been heavily circulated.
