= Cash coins in art =

Art motif based on coins with a square centre hole

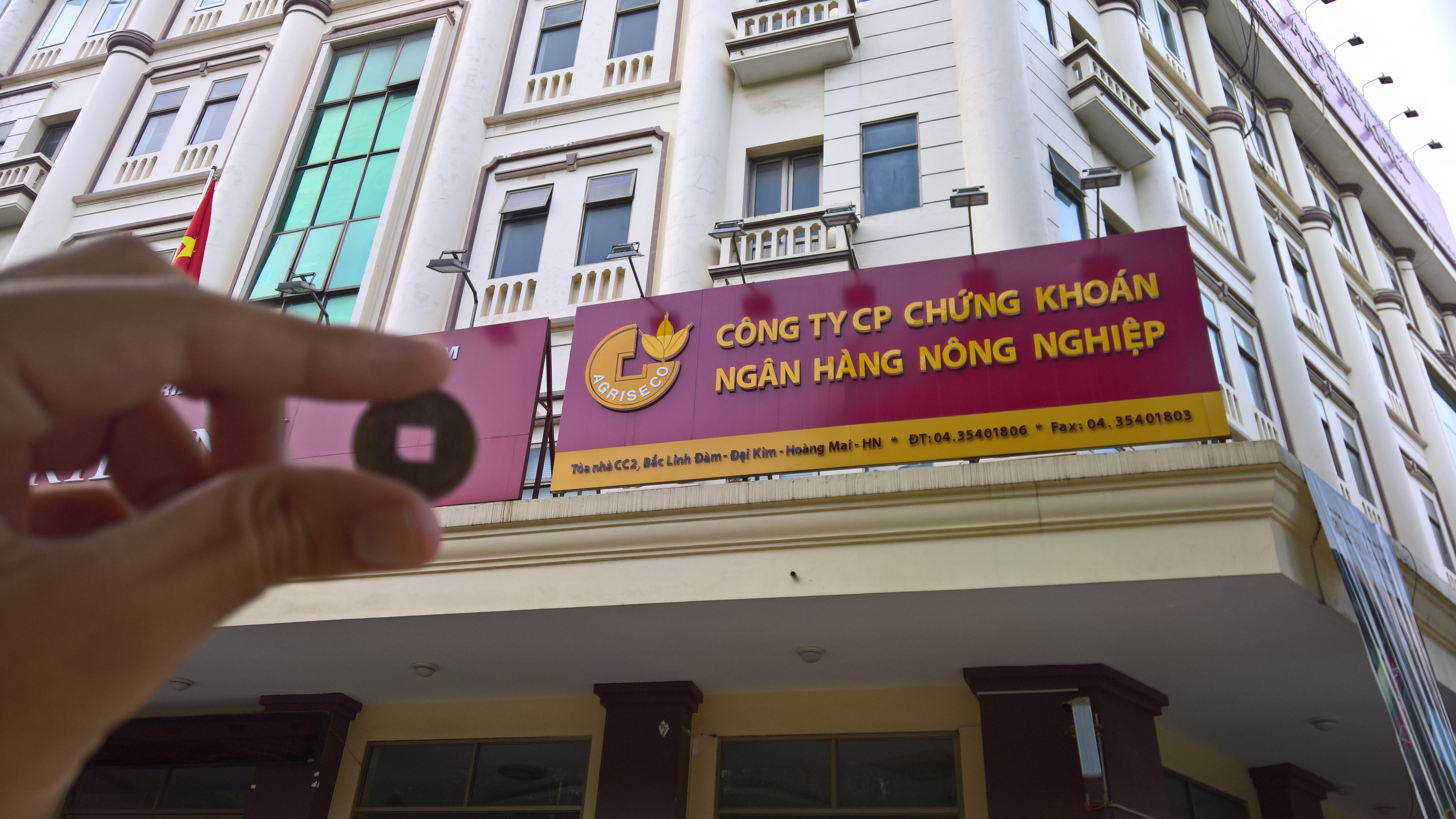
- A cash coin used as part of the logo of Agriseco in the Hoàng Mai District, Hanoi, Vietnam.
- Traditional Chinese: 銅錢紋
- Simplified Chinese: 铜钱纹
- Literal meaning: copper coin motif
Transcriptions
Standard Mandarin
- Hanyu Pinyin: tóng qián wén

Alternative Chinese name
- Traditional Chinese: 金錢紋
- Simplified Chinese: 金钱纹
- Literal meaning: gold coin motif
Transcriptions
Standard Mandarin
- Hanyu Pinyin: jīn qián wén

Cash coins are a type of historical Chinese, Japanese, Korean, Ryukyuan, and Vietnamese coin design that was the main basic design for the Chinese cash, Japanese mon, Korean mun, Ryukyuan mon, and Vietnamese văn currencies. The cash coin became the main standard currency of China in 221 BC with the Ban Liang (半兩) and would be produced until 1912 AD there with the Minguo Tongbao (民國通寶), the last series of cash coins produced in the world were the French Indochinese Bảo Đại Thông Bảo (保大通寶) during the 1940s. Cash coins are round coins with a square centre hole. It is commonly believed that the early round coins of the Warring States period resembled the ancient jade circles (璧環) which symbolised the supposed round shape of the sky, while the centre hole in this analogy is said to represent the planet earth (天圓地方). The body of these early round coins was called their "flesh" (肉) and the central hole was known as "the good" (好).

While cash coins are no longer produced as official currency today, they remain a common motif in the countries where they once circulated and among the diaspora of those communities. Most commonly cash coins are associated with "good luck" and "wealth" today and are commonly known as "Chinese lucky coins" because of their usage in charms and feng shui (see "Cash coins in feng shui"). Cash coins also appear in fortune telling (see "Cash coins in fortune telling") and traditional Chinese medicine (see "Cash coins in traditional Chinese medicine"). Furthermore, cash coins are often found in the logos and emblems of financial institutions in East Asia and Vietnam because of their association with "wealth" and their historical value.

== Amulets ==
Cash coin designs are commonly used as a basic design for various amulets, talismans, and charms throughout the far east, these coin-like amulets often include the general design of cash coins but with different inscriptions. Some amulets and charms include may also include images of cash coins as they are associated with "wealth". Sometimes images of sycees, another form of ancient Chinese coinage, are used as a symbol in amulets, talismans, and charms for "wealth".

In amulets cash coins can be a symbol not just of "wealth and prosperity", but also the word "before" and of completeness. The latter is because the Mandarin Chinese word for "coin" (錢; qián) sounds like "before" (前; qián). An archaic Mandarin Chinese term for coins (泉; quán) sounds like the word for "complete" (全; quán).

In the island of Bali, Indonesia Pis Bolong (Chinese cash coins) are used as coin-charms and while both authentic and fake Chinese cash coins are used in various rituals and ceremonies by the Balinese Hindu community and used to make souvenir items for tourists, there exist many local versions of the Pis Bolong which are in fact amulets based on these cash coins. It is common for traditional Balinese families to have 200 pieces of Pis Bolong in their household to the point that cash coins could be found in almost every corner of every traditional household on the island.

== Architecture ==
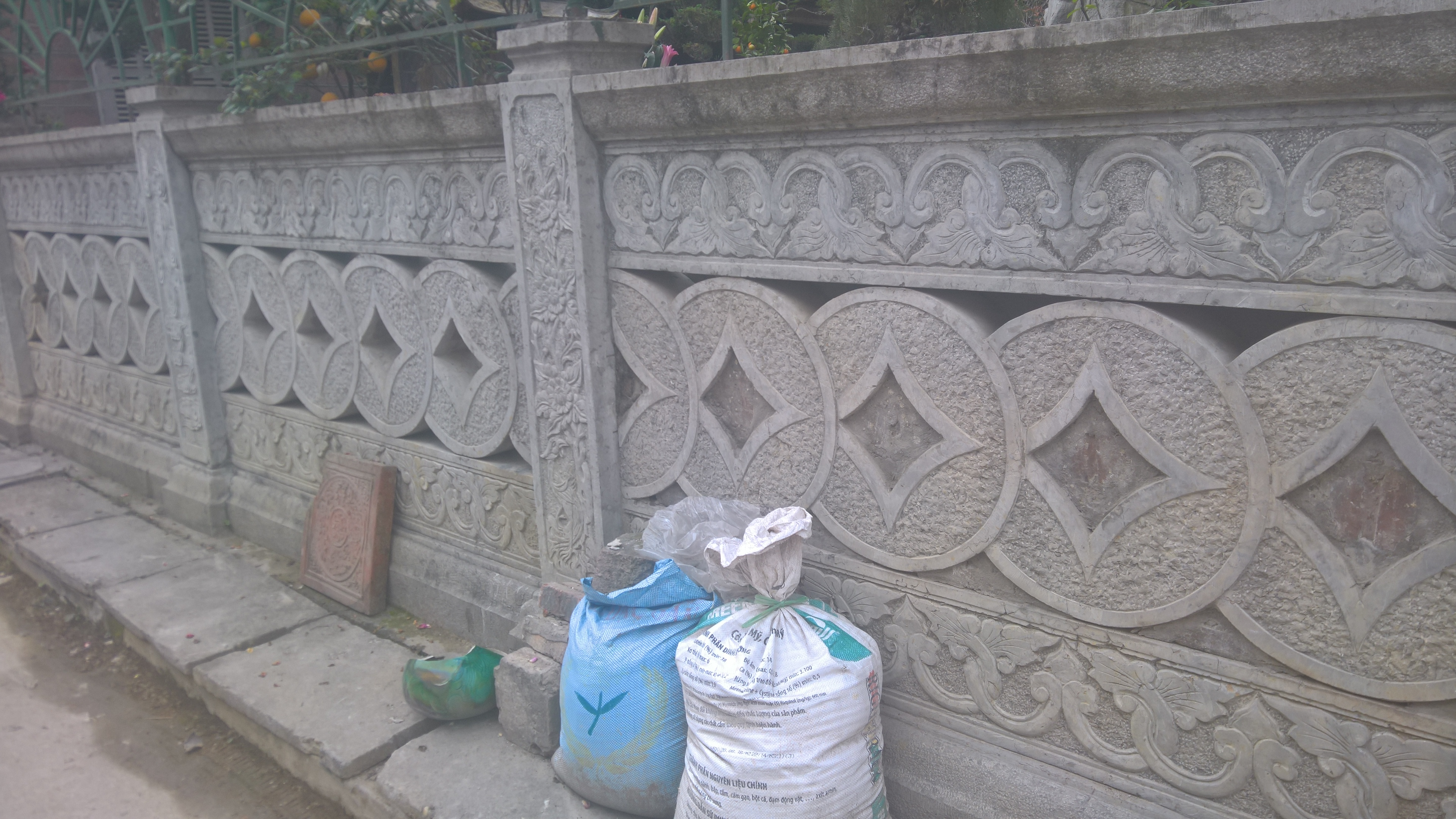
A cash coin motif at a temple wall in the village of Bát Tràng, Gia Lâm District, Hanoi.

=== Liu Song dynasty tomb ===
On 13 August 2013 a video broadcast by Hubei TV (HBTV 湖北网台) had revealed the discovery of an ancient tomb dating back to the Liu Song dynasty (Northern and Southern dynasties period) somewhere in June 2013, the tomb was unearthed at a construction site in the city of Xiangyang, Hubei. At this tomb several of its brick display images of Chinese cash coins. Other bricks inside of this tomb display the Chinese character Wang (王; "King"). According to Liang Chao (梁超), an archaeologist with the Xiangyang Archaeology Institute (襄阳市考古研究所) the bricks with the Chinese character "王" was probably the "logo" or "emblem" of the craftsman who constructed the bricks that were used to make the tomb, and note that perhaps Wang might have been a famous brand of tomb bricks during the Liu Song dynasty period. The owner of the tomb was identified by two bricks which contain the inscription nán yáng zōng (南陽宗), which note that the owner was named "Zong" (宗) and originated from the city of Nanyang, Henan. The tomb was identified to have been constructed in the year 461 by an inscription on a brick which reads "Song Da Ming Wu Nian Zao" (宋大明五年造, "Built in the 5th year of the Da Ming reign of the State of Song").

Not a single artifact was discovered inside of the Liu Sog dynasty era tomb which indicates that tomb robbers had looted it sometime in the distant past before its rediscovery.

=== Luo City Wall ===
During the Tang dynasty and later the Kingdom of Min periods a city wall in present-day Fuzhou, Fujian was constructed under Wang Shenzhi. The wall is made from bricks that display the design of an ancient Chinese cash coin. Construction of the wall began in the year 901 during the Tang dynasty and continued during the Kingdom of Min.

In the year 2012, about 1,100 years after its construction this wall was unearthed in Fuzhou. Historical records specifically mention the unusual cash coin design on the bricks used to build the "Luo city wall" (羅城; luó chéng) which is how archaeologists managed to identify the wall. Further confirmation that the archaeological find is indeed the famous "Luo City wall" constructed by the Kingdom of Min was later obtained when other bricks at the site were discovered to have the Chinese characters 威武軍 (wēi wǔ jūn), which translates into English as the "Powerful Army", incorporated into their design. Wei Wu Jun was the name of the army Wang Shenzhi commanded. In 2012 the unearthed portions of the "Luo City wall" measures about 74 meters in length and around 8 meters in width.

According to historical records, the "Luo City wall" was severely damaged in battle during the Song dynasty period. During the People's Republic of China period the site where the "Luo City wall" once stood was used as a rubbish dump and would later become the location of a transport station.

=== Fangyuan Mansion ===
The famous Taiwanese architect Chu-Yuan Lee had designed the Fangyuan Building (方圓大廈; fāng yuán dà shà) in the city of Shenyang, Liaoning, which was completed in the year 2001. The 25-storey high-rise building is shaped like a stack of ancient Chinese cash coins. The Fangyuan Mansion has been described as one of the world's ugliest buildings.

The Fangyuan Mansion has been compared to the later made Guangzhou Circle due to its similar design features.

=== Taipei 101 ===
The Taipei 101, which was officially classified as the world's tallest building from its opening in 2004 until the 2008 completion of the Shanghai World Financial Center in Shanghai, China, located in the city of Taipei, features a number of designs that are intended to attract good luck, among these architectural features are giant gold coins, in the shape of ancient Chinese cash coins, that adorn all four sides at the base of the tower.

Other lucky symbols from traditional Chinese culture incorporated into the design of the Taipei 101 include the fact that the building is divided into eight separate segments, which is an intentional lucky number choice because the number 8 in Mandarin Chinese sounds like the Mandarin word that means "wealthy". Furthermore, dragons and "auspicious clouds" decorate the skyscrapers corners.

== Bank logos ==
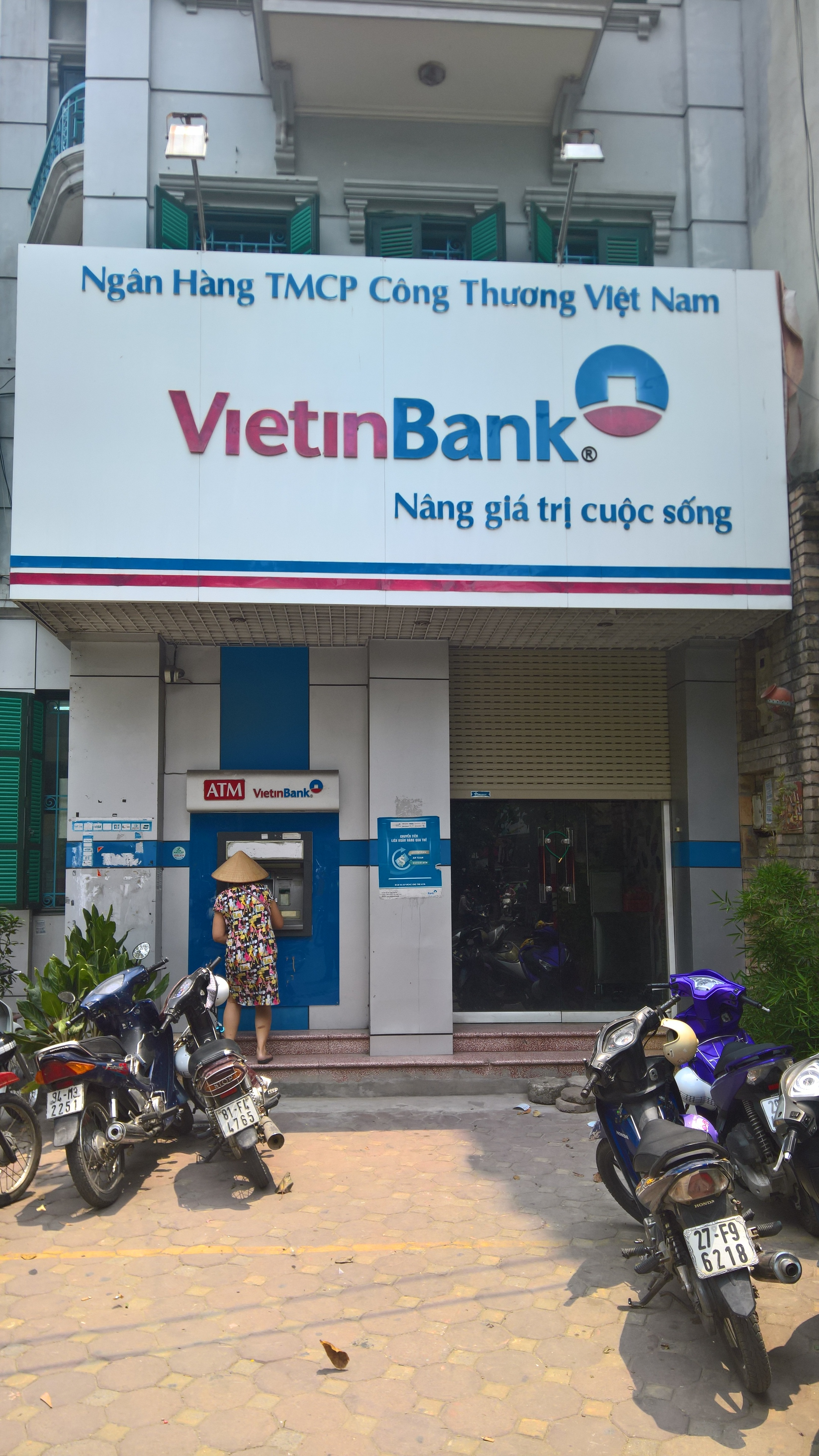
A VietinBank branch office in the Trưng Sisters District, Hanoi. Its logo is shaped like a Vietnamese cash coin.

Several logos of Chinese banks incorporate cash coins into their designs, this is because cash coins have become a cultural icon in China, and the cash coin motif has been incorporated in the logo design of a number of major banks. Some banks also incorporate other forms of ancient Chinese coinage into the designs of their emblems, for example the logo of the People's Bank of China is based on spade money from the Warring States Period.

- The logo of the Bank of China includes in its design the archetypal cash coin motif. It changes the design by instead of incorporating a simple square centre hole, it uses a stylised version of the Chinese character 中 (Zhōng; "middle" or "centre") as an abbreviation for 中國 (Zhōngguó; "central state").
- The logo of the Industrial and Commercial Bank of China uses the standard cash coin motif, but instead of having a square centre hole, it uses a stylised version of the Chinese character "工", which translates into English as "commercial". The stylised centre can also be interpreted as being a capital version of the Latin letter "I", representing the English word "industrial". The "centre hole" of the cash coin motif of the logo therefore represents the essence of the bank's name both in English and in Mandarin, the "Industrial and Commercial Bank of China".
- The logo of the China Construction Bank incorporates two Chinese cash coins, which are placed side-by-side with a slight overlap, this overlap gives the image a three-dimensional effect. Furthermore, small piece of the circular design of the cash coins has been removed so that they resemble two of the Latin letter "C". The two "C's" in this design stand for the English name of the bank, "China Construction".
- The logo of the Huaxia Bank incorporates the cash coin design by using white space rather than colouring it in. The white space surrounds a gray square and is enclosed by an auspicious red border based on a "jade dragon" from the Hongshan Culture.

The logos of a number of Vietnamese banks incorporate cash coin designs, these include the logos of the VietinBank, National Citizen Bank (Ngân Hàng Quốc Dân), Orient Commercial Joint Stock Bank, and SeABank among others.

== Banknotes ==
Imperial Chinese banknotes that were denominated in strings of cash coins often featured designs depicting physical strings of cash coins to showcase their nominal value, usually the higher their denomination was the more cash coins were displayed on the paper note.

A Tang dynasty era Kaiyuan Tongbao (開元通寳) cash coin appears on the reverse side of a 2010 Hong Kong banknote issued by the Standard Chartered Bank with a face value of $1,000.

== Bronze mirrors ==
It was reported on 5 January 2012 a bronze mirror incorporating a cash coin design were discovered during the excavation of a Song dynasty period tomb in Longwan Zhen (龙湾镇), Qianjiang, Hubei.

== Ceramics ==
Chinese cash coins were used decoratively and symbolically at least as early as the Han dynasty period, and cash coin designs have been incised into the body of Chinese ceramics as early the Song dynasty period, such as with the Yaozhou meiping vase. But the usage of cash coin designs became more popular during the Ming dynasty period. During the 17th century cash coin-like "base-marks", or dikuan (底款), began to appear using the era names and reign titles of the contemporary monarch. Some of these base-marks are presented in a similar manner as cash coins and may contain inscriptions like Changming Fugui (長命富貴), while others are direct imitations of cash coins and may even include cash coin inscriptions like Hongwu Tongbao (洪武通寶).

== Commemorative coins ==
- In 1864, the Kingdom of Siam issued a silver commemorative coin with a denomination of 1 tamlueng (4 baht) to commemorate the 60th birthday of King Rama IV. The obverse side of this coin features a Makuṭa, while the reverse side a si jue (四訣) cash coin with the inscription "กรุง สยาม" (Krung s̄yām) inside of the square hole and the inscription "鄭明通寳" (Dên Mêng Tong Bo) written top-to-bottom, right-to-left. Each star on the obverse of this coin represents the value of 1 fuang. Dên Mêng (鄭明) was the Chinese name of King Rama IV.
- In 1998 the People's Republic of China issued a silver commemorative 10 yuan cash coin based on the Da-Tang Zhenku (大唐鎮庫) vault protector coin.
- In 2004 the Republic of Kazakhstan issued a silver commemorative cash coin with the denomination of 500 tenge featuring the design of an ancient cash coin that circulated in what is today known as Kazakhstan.
- In 2006 South Korea issued a silver ₩ 20,000 commemorative cash coin celebrating the 560th anniversary of the Hangul alphabet on Hangul Day. It features the inscriptions "560돌 한글날 기 림" (560th Anniversary Hangeul Day), "효례뎨의" (filial piety and good manners), "2006 한국은행" (2006 Bank of Korea), and "이만원" (20,000 won) and won an award for Most Technically Advanced Coin.
- In 2007 Canada issued a silver commemorative cash coin with the denomination of 8 dollars designed by Harvey Chan; on one side it features a portrait of the Canadian queen Elizabeth II and the traditional Chinese characters "福祿壽" (Fú Lù Shòu, written right-left-bottom) surrounding the square central hole and the Latin inscription "D·G·REGINA" (Queen by grace of God) below the name of the reigning monarch. On the other side of the coin it features the denomination, issuing country, and year of issue in the rim while three symbolic creatures surround the square hole, namely the bat, deer, and a Chinese dragon, which are traditionally associated with good fortune, prosperity, and honour in Chinese culture. The silver cash coin was issued to commemorate the Chinese community in Canada and was inspired by the fact that early Chinese migrants used cash coins as tokens when trading with each other.
- In 2008 France issued two commemorative coins that featured an image of a Kan'ei Tsūhō (寛永通寳) cash coin on its reverse, one was a silver coin with a nominal value of €1.50 and the other was a gold coin with a nominal value of €10.
- In 2008 Japan issued a new series of commemorative coins under the "Japan 47 Prefectures Coin Program" to mark the 60th Anniversary of Enforcement of the Local Autonomy Law, in this programme the Japan Mint issues bi-colour clad coins with the denomination of 500 yen and silver coins with the denomination of 1000 yen for each of 47 prefectures in Japan until the year 2016. The obverse of both coins carry designs featuring each of the prefecture's representative scenery, history, industry, famous historical figures, and other things associated with the prefecture, while, the reverse sides all feature the same design differing only in inscription and year of issue (using the Japanese imperial calendar). The reverse side of the bi-colour clad coins (Copper 75%, Zinc 12.5%, Nickel 12.5%) feature the design of a cash coin with the Kanji inscription "地方自治" (local autonomy) written clockwise.
- In 2009 the Isle of Man issued a silver commemorative cash coin entitled "The Making of the Soldier" engraved by Ian Rank-Broadley with a denomination of 1 crown (1/4 pound) featuring on one side a portrait (effigy) of the Manx lady Elizabeth II and the inscription "Isle of Man 2009 - Elizabeth II" and an encirclement of small figures making a terracotta soldier with its denomination and the traditional Chinese characters "秦始皇" (Qin Shi Huang) on the other side. The silver cash coin was issued to commemorate the Terracotta Army Exhibition at the British Museum.
- In 2016 Canada issued a silver commemorative cash coin of 8 dollars designed by Canadian artist Charles Vinh, on its heads side it features a portrait of the Canadian queen Elizabeth II surrounded by two Fenghuang, which are associated with the feminine, and the inscription "Elizabeth II D·G·REGINA" (Elizabeth II, queen by grace of God) and on its tails side a tiger and a Chinese dragon facing a Yin and Yang symbol surrounded by elemental flames alongside its denomination, year of issue, and issuing country. A gold version with the denomination of 200 dollars was issued alongside it.
- In November 2022 Portugal issued a commemorative €5.00 coin entitled A Arte da Porcelana based on the design of a cash coin to "celebrate the taste of the Portuguese for porcelain" (Homenagear o gosto pela porcelana). The centre square hole is claimed to be a "reference to the well-known Chinese Feng-Shui coins" (Remetendo para as conhecidas moedas-amuleto em circulação na China). It is the second entry in the series "Portugal and the East" (Portugal e o Oriente) with a motif typically found on both Chinese and Portuguese porcelain. The commemorative cash coin was designed by the artist André Carrilho who worked together with the technical team of the Imprensa Nacional-Casa da Moeda, Carrilho claimed that the design of the coin was inspired both by the designs of porcelain art as well as his own personal experiences in the former Portuguese colony of Macau. This coin was issued in both silver and gold versions.

== Jin Chan ==
The Jin Chan (金蟾; jīn chán; 'Golden Toad'), also called Chan Chuy (蟾蜍; chánchú; 'Toad') is usually depicted as a bullfrog with red eyes, flared nostrils and only one hind leg (for a total of three legs), sitting on a pile of traditional Chinese cash, with a coin in its mouth. On its back, it often displays seven diamond spots. According to Feng Shui beliefs, Jin Chan helps attract and protect wealth, and guards against bad luck. Because it symbolizes the flow of money, Feng Shui lore insists that a Jin Chan statue should not be positioned facing the main door ("outward"). It also "should never be kept in the bathroom, bedroom, dining room or kitchen".

The Jin Chan is a legendary animal of the Han people. The money toad is associated with the Daoist monk, Liu Haichan, as the sennin's animal companion.

== Flags and banners ==
=== Oda Nobunaga ===
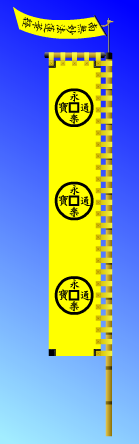
The flag (Nobori) of Oda Nobunaga displaying Chinese Eiraku Tsūhō (永樂通寶) cash coins.

On the 5th month of the year Eiroku 3 (永禄三, or 1560 in the Gregorian calendar), daimyō Oda Nobunaga was preparing for the Battle of Okehazama and while he had an army of forty thousand men, he could only gather around two and a half thousand soldiers for this decisive battle, Oda Nobunaga then went to pray for a victorious military campaign at the nearby Atsuta-jingū, he asked the Gods to show him a sign that his prayers would be answered and while looking at a handful of Eiraku Tsūhō (永樂通寶) cash coins decided to throw them in the air, when they fell back on the ground they all landed with heads up, he took this as a sign that the Gods would bless him and informed his men that they shall be victorious as they Gods favoured them. After winning the battle he used the Eiraku Tsūhō as a motif for his nobori (a type of flag or banner) and then he had these Eiraku Tsūhō coins inlayed on the tsuba of the sword which he carried during the battle. After Oda Nobunaga's forces were victorious his retainer Hayashi Hidesada said that the Gods must've really spoken through these coins to which Nobunaga replied by saying the Zen Buddhist proverb "I only know that I'm okay with what I got" (吾唯知足, ware tada taru o shiru) and presented to him an Eiraku Tsūhō coin of which both the obverse and reverse sides were heads. Family crests with this proverb written around a square hole resembling a cash coin are not uncommon among military families. Another possibility as to why Oda Nobunaga used Eiraku Tsūhō cash coins as a motif on his nobori was because Eiraku Tsūhō were originally all imported from Ming China during the Muromachi period and spread throughout Japan as the de facto currency, speculation has it that Nobunaga tried to emulate this by having Eiraku Tsūhō as his emblem meaning that his power too shall spread throughout Japan.

The tsuba Oda Nobunaga was carrying during his military campaigns which had the Eiraku Tsūhō inlayed into it was nicknamed the "invincibility tsuba" (まけずの鍔) as he had won all battles he had fought while carrying that tsuba. The Eiraku Tsūhō are divided on this tsuba with 6 being on the omote and 7 of them are displayed on the ura side. This tsuba was declared to be a kokuhō (national treasure) in 1920.

== Food and beverages ==
=== Doncha ===
Doncha (돈차; lit. '"money tea"'), also called jeoncha (전차; 錢茶; lit. '"money tea"'), is a cash coin-shaped post-fermented tea produced in Korea. Tea leaves for doncha are hand-picked in May, from the tea plants that grow wild somewhere on the southern coast of the Korean Peninsula. Although roasting is the most common method of tea processing in Korea, doncha processing starts with steaming the tea leaves. Twelve hours after the harvest, tea leaves are steamed in a gamasot, a traditional cauldron. Steamed leaves are then pounded in a jeolgu, a traditional mortar, or a maetdol, a traditional millstone. the tea is then shaped into round lumps and sun-dried. Once dried, a hole is made in the center of each lump of tea and they attain the characteristic shape of yeopjeon ("leaf coin" or "cash coin") from which their name is derived. The tea is then fermented for at least six months as aging helps to develop an enriched flavor and aroma, though sometimes fermentation can last for over twenty years.

== Mahjong ==
While in the modern era Mahjong tiles do not often feature images of cash coins anymore, historically Mahjong was based on the Chinese money-suited decks, which are playing cards with designs based directly on cash coins. From the early 20th century onwards modern Mahjong tiles stopped referencing cash coins but these references remain in suit names and in terminology.

=== Cash coin-based terminology in Mahjong ===
Around 1872 collector Karl Georg Frederich Julius Himly noted the similarity in names between the Chinese money-suited playing deck names and Mahjong tile sets, as well as the number of suits and number of tiles/cards in each suit.

Historically Mahjong tiles depicted bamboo stalks as strings of cash coins, because of this the bamboo suit is still sometimes referred to as "a string of cash coins". This can also be alluded to by the fact that Mahjong uses a suit called Tong (筒; "Bamboo tube"), as recorded in the 1892 novel Haishang hua liezhuan ("A Biography of Flowers of Shanghai") by Han Bangqing, which is a homophone with the term Tong (銅; "Cash") and because of their similar pronunciation these terms may have been confused with each other.

=== The origins of Mahjong and cash coin-based playing cards ===
The evolution of money-suited playing cards into Mahjong was a slow process that occurred somewhere during the Qing dynasty.

Ming dynasty period scholar Lu Rong described a four player trick taking playing card game named dòu yèzǐ (鬥叶子; "Compete with Leaves") with 38 cards, while Pan Zhiheng described a game named mǎ diào (馬掉; "Horse Dropping [a Leg]") with 40 cards. Meanwhile, about Ming dynasty period writer named Feng Menglong (1574–1646) claimed that the 40 card game was called either mǎ diào (馬吊; "Horse Hanging [a leg]") or mǎ diào jiǎo (馬吊腳; "Horse Hanging [up one leg]"). These 4-suited card decks inspired the creation of another money-suited card set with only 3 decks (or 30 cards) which later evolved into a 6-suited deck. The 4-suited deck continued to be used into the Qing dynasty t but seems to have disappeared by the end of the 19th century.

In the year 1783 author Jin Xueshi wrote a book called Mu zhu xianhua ("Idle Chats on the Swineherds' Game") which describes different types of families of games including games from the same family as Mahjong, such as mò hú (默和), which could be translated as either "Silent harmony" or "Playing Silently"), which had 60 cards. This 60-card money-suited deck was later doubled to become a 120 card money-suited deck, this had effectively quadruplicated each card. This money-suited deck of 120 cards allowed for the formation of melds of three or four cards together from the same suit of cards, an example of this can be found in the 18th century card game named pèng hú (碰和; "Encountering Harmony", or "Playing for Points"). These melds of playing cards, in addition to sequences of consecutive numbers of cards from the same suit, were found in another pèng hú-type playing card game named shí hú (十壺; "Ten Points" or sometimes translated as "Ten Pots").

The evolution of these money-suited card games into the modern game of Mahjong can be attested to the fact that the term pèng hú was used for, amongst a plurality of things, an 18th-century domino game which used 105 cards as well the name for a group of different Qing dynasty period games that shared the same basic characteristics as the popular pèng hú money-suited playing card game. Most importantly, during the late 19th and early 20th centuries the term pèng hú-style game was also used as the name for the game of má jiàng (rendered in English as "Mahjong"), it just took the transfer of the three quadruplicated suits of cards into a domino tile format combined with the addition of the wind directions and a number of extra tiles.

German collector Karl Georg Frederich Julius Himly noted in his 1889 article, Die Abteilung der Spiele im 'Spiegel der Mandschu-Sprache (The Section of Games in "The Mirror of the Manchu Language"), that Mahjong was related to Chinese playing cards of the money-suited deck family. In his earlier 1889 article, Himly states that his "Ningpoer Bambuskarten" (Bamboo Cards of Ningbo), was part of his own collection of Chinese playing card packs, in other words, they belonged to the playing card family. In a 1901 article Karl Himly elaborates on the suit names and terms used by the "proto-Mahjong(g)" game. (Note: Karl Georg Frederich Julius Himly (1836–1904) arrived in China in the year 1865, which was the same year he finished university, until 1867 he was in Beijing as a student-interpreter, then he would become an interpreter for the German Consular Service in Chifoo, he lived in Shanghai from 1871 to 1872. Karl Himly would resume work in the year 1872 until 1876 when he retired and returned to Germany. This meant that therefore Karl Himly collected his set of Mahjong some time between the years of 1868–1870, or between the years of 1872–1876. This is roughly concurrent with the set collected by Glover sometime between 1872 and 1873.)

Later studies into the origins of Mahjong and into Chinese playing cards in general such as those by Wilkinson and Culin et al., were found to be in line with the hypotheses proposed by Himly when analysing the properties of his playing card collection. The Chinese generally make no distinction between the thicknesses of their cards in their playing card games and are addressed with the same word. The Chinese refer to playing cards of all thicknesses and of all materials as "pai" (literally translated into English as "plaque"). This means that all references to "pai" from these early Western works use this term for both playing cards and similar games such as proto-Mahjong(g), or Maqiao (麻雀), its main pre-1949 pronunciation). These cards should have likely have been made of very thick bamboo plaques or cards, known as Zhupai (竹牌; 'dominoes'), which were essentially bamboo tiles. The proto-Mahjong(g) from the Himly collection was thus known as Ningbo Zhupai (寧波竹牌).

Another proto-Mahjong(g) game from this period was Shi Hu (十壺; "Ten Points" or "Ten Pots"), which was likely a variant of the earlier game Peng Hu (碰和). This game was referenced in the Yangzhou huafanglu ("The Painted Pleasure Boats of Yangzhou") by the author Li Dou, that was prefaced in the year 1796; Later the game Peng Hu was also referenced in the novel Huifanglu ("A Record of Painted Fragrance"), which was written by Xiling Yeqiao around the year 1878.

It was in the context of the quadruplicated, three suited games that used "Shi Hu Pai" that Himly placed the game of Ningbo Zhu Pai from his collection.

"The bamboo cards of Ningpo [Ningbo] cannot be separated from the shi hu pai because of the [索] suo and [万] wan [that are] present in them. So we have to add ... the bamboo cards of Ningpo [Ningbo], which have 36 [同] tong instead of [鉼] bing, besides the well-known 36 suo and 36 wan.6 .... We have to add the three [化] hua as they carry the names [索化] suo hua, [万化] wan hua, [同化] tong hua,7 so they must have a certain relation to these three basic regulars of the shi hu cards" [that is, the three 枝花 zhi hua, 'flower' cards, each associated with a shi hu pai suit].

— Karl Georg Frederich Julius Himly (1901). With annotations from From Cards to Tiles: The Origin of Mahjong(g)'s Earliest Suit Names (The MAHJONG Tile Set) by Michael Stanwick and Hongbing Xu.

Because of this logic Karl Himly used the names of the suo and wan suits as the criteria that made him include the Ningbo bamboo tiles game into the "Shi Hu Pai" category of playing cards.

The game terms Shi Hu and Maqiao were primarily used in the cities of Wenzhou and Hangzhou in Zhejiang province during the 1890s, while Penghu was primarily played in Shanghai for the game-play, whereas Maqiao was used as the name of the playing cards in Zhejiang province but as the name of the game-play in Shanghai. The games also had specific terms for the "pai" that were used to play with them, for example the game of Shi Hu was played with cards called Peng Hu Pai (碰和牌; "Plaques of (the game) Peng Hu") these cards were named after the prevailing game of the time. Later at the height of the popularity of the Shi Hu game the cards that were used to play it may have become known as Shi Hu Pai (十壺牌; "Plaques of (the game) Shi Hu").

The currently known evidence into the origins of Mahjong strengthen the hypotheses put forth by Himly that Mahjong was based on suits of cards that had game systems based on cash coins and many early Mahjong and Mahjong-like games used cash coin terminology for their gameplay.

== Medals and medallions ==
=== Presentation coins and the Sapèque d'Honneur ===
Special cash coins were also produced in the form of decorations given by the government of the Nguyễn dynasty until 1945, like in Imperial China these coins came in the form of presentation coins (known in Vietnamese as Tiền), but after French colonisation these special cash coin awards known as Tiền was later also awarded as European-style medals called the Sapèque d'Honneur ("Cash coin of Honour").

These presentation coin decorations came in multiple classes and were known as Đồng Tiền (銅錢, "Copper money"), Ngân Tiền (銀錢, "Silver money"), and Kim Tiền (金錢, "Gold money"). The Sapèque d'Honneur medal was further subdivided into the Sapèque d'Argent (made of silver) and the Sapèque d'Or (made of gold).

These decorations generally took the shape of silver or gold cash coins as well as other coinages issued by the Nguyễn dynasty, but would often have more elaborate designs and (often) different inscriptions.

=== Millennium Medal ===
In 1999 artist Mariam Fountain created the Millennium Medal, a "good luck symbol" for the new millennium, its circular shape symbolises the heavens and the medal features a person looking through the square centre hole symbolising the planet earth, the person embraces both the new day and the wide world. People wore this medal on 1 January 2000 as "a prize" for just "being there" during the turn of the millennium. A card initially accompanying the medals for those who purchased it had the statement: "to be worn and polished from hand to hand for the next 1000 years". It notes that the details of the Millennium Medal will eventually be rubbed away, which will accentuate the quintessential symbol of the planet earth and the heavens. The design of the Millennium Medal was later used for the Parisian Franco-British Lawyers Society medal in 2002.

== Native American and Alaska natives art ==
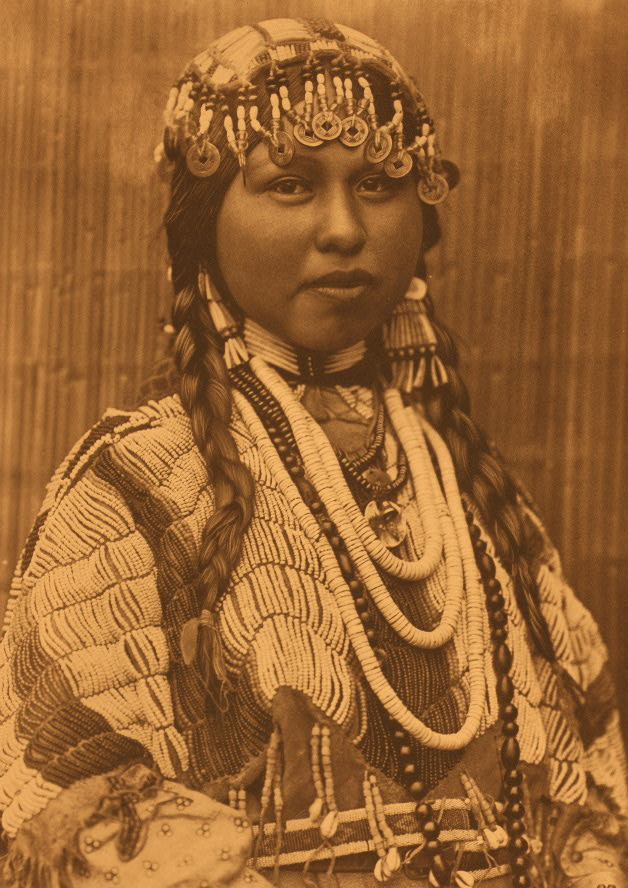
A photograph of a young Wishram woman in bridal garb. Note the Qing dynasty cash coins in her headdress.

=== Tlingit body armour ===
The Tlingits used a body armour made from Chinese cash coins, these coins were introduced by Russian traders from Qing China between the seventeenth and eighteenth centuries who traded them for animal skins which were in turn traded with the Chinese for tea, silk, and porcelain by these European traders. The Tlingits believed that these cash coins would protect them from knife attacks and guns used by other indigenous American tribes and Russians. Some Tlingit body armours are completely covered in Qing dynasty era cash coins while others have them sewn in chevron patterns. One Russian account from a battle with the Tlingits in 1792 states "bullets were useless against the Tlingit armour", however this would likely be attributed to the inaccuracy of contemporary Russian smoothbore muskets than the body armour and the Chinese coins might have played a more important role in psychological warfare than have any practical application on the battlefield. Other than on their armour the Tlingits also used Chinese cash coins on masks and ceremonial robes such as the Gitxsan dancing cape as these coins were used as a symbol of wealth representing a powerful far away country. The cash coins used by the Tlingit are all from the Qing dynasty and bear inscriptions of the Shunzhi, Kangxi, and Yongzheng Emperors.

== Playing cards ==
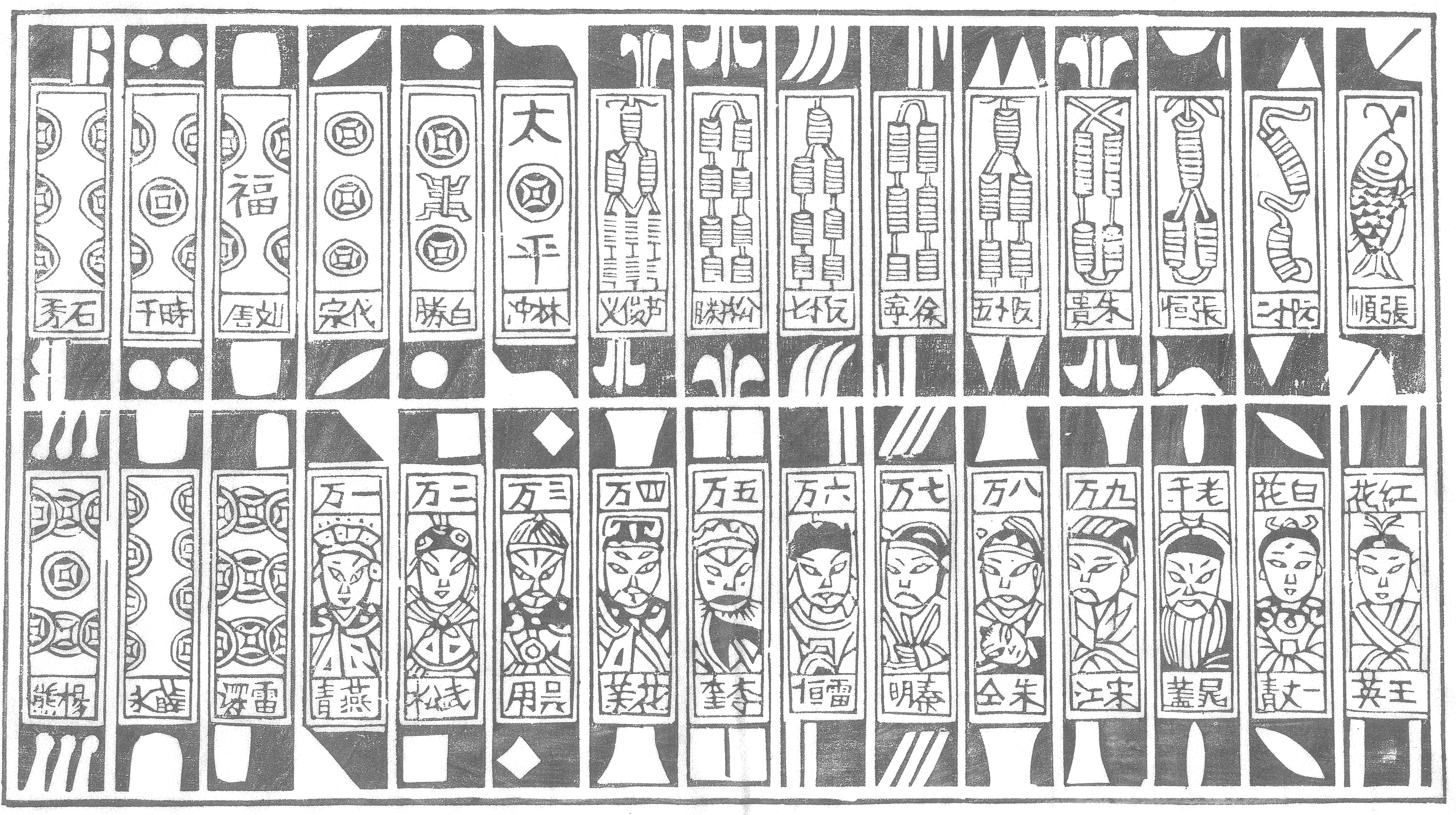
Three-suited Water Margin deck, markings on ends serve as indices.

The earliest Chinese playing cards included designs with a different numbers of cash coins shown on each card. Money-suited decks typically contain 38 cards in four suits, all of which are based on money: cash / coins (同; 銅; tong, (copper, as in copper-alloy cash coins) or 并; 餅; bing, (cake, as in a cake of silver) or 筒; tong ("bamboo tube").), strings of coins (either 索; suo ("strings of cash") or 条; 條; tiao ("strings")), myriads of strings (万; 萬; wan, usually accompanied with images of human figures or portraits, sometimes these were heavily abstracted), and tens of myriads (of strings, of coins – 十萬貫). The smallest value depict one cash coin per card and the largest one depict ten strings of ten cash coins.

The money-suited cards are believed by some scholars to be an ancestor of the four-suited decks of Islamic and European playing cards.

During the reign of the Ming dynasty the Late Ming period scholars Lu Rong and Pan Zhiheng wrote about the 40 card money-suited decks and their modified versions, these works were translated by Andrew Lo of the School of Oriental and African Studies, London. According to Lo there were two particular manuals on Chinese card games that are today among the earliest surviving descriptions of money-suited decks, namely "A Manual of Leaves (Cards)" and the "A Sequel to a Manual of Leaves (Cards)". These extant records on the history of Chinese card games explain that the three-suited card deck was a modification of a pre-existing four suited card deck.

== Sand-drawings ==
There is a "coin-shaped sand-drawing" or Zenigata suna-e (銭形砂絵) based on the Japanese Kan'ei Tsūhō (寛永通寳) cash coins whose origins date back to 1633 in the Kotohiki Park which lies in Kan'onji, Kagawa Prefecture.

== Seals ==
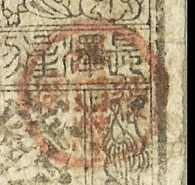
A cash coin-shaped banknote seal on a Hansatsu.

Some Japanese Hansatsu feature banknote seals shaped like cash coins.

== Snuff-bottles ==
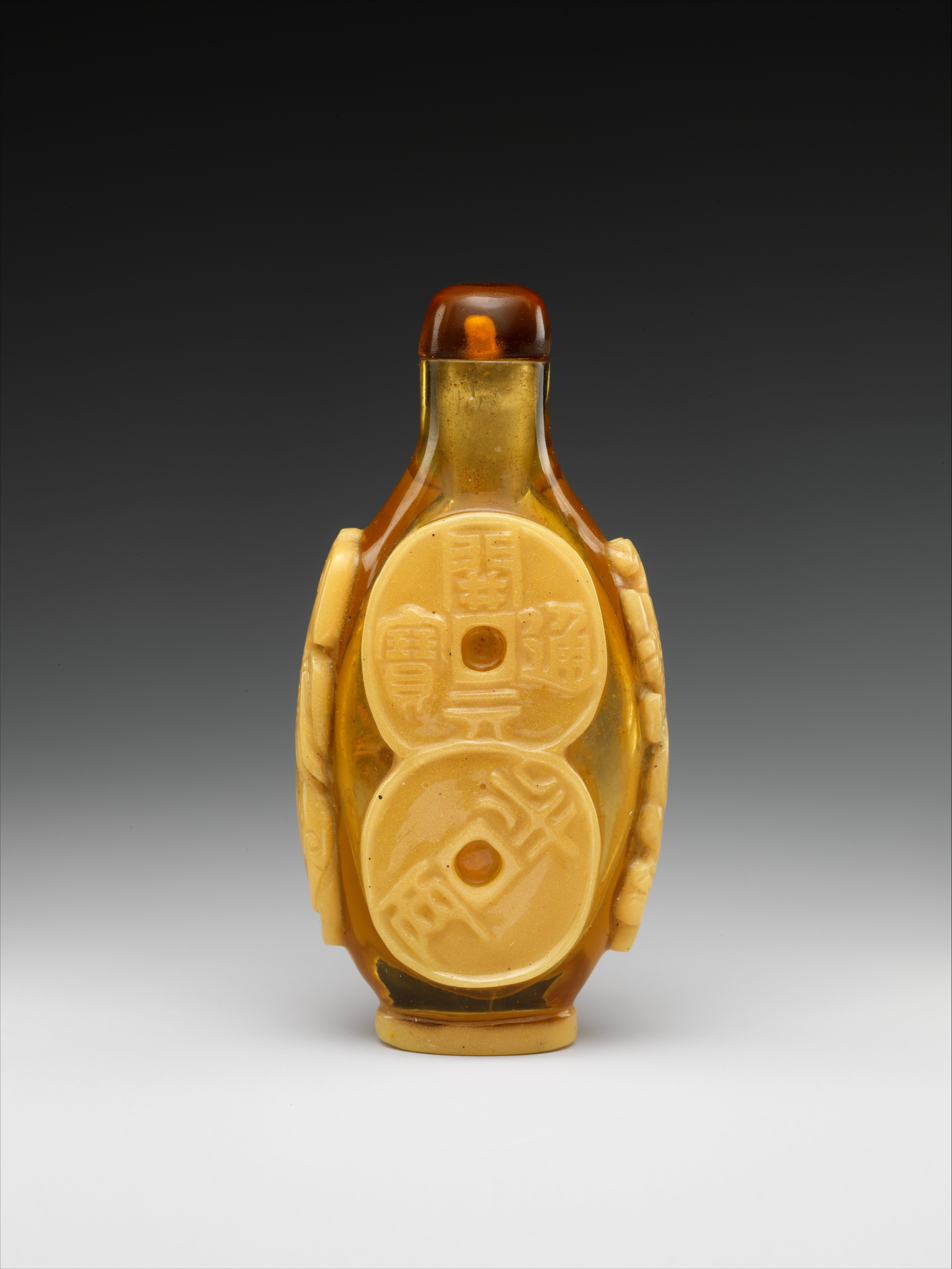
A 19th century Qing dynasty period snuff-bottle that depicts a Kaiyuan Tongbao (開元通寳) and a Ban Liang (半兩) cash coin, on display at the Metropolitan Museum of Art, New York City, United States.

Cash coin designs appeared on snuff-bottles, Chinese snuff-bottles feature a large number of designs based on various topics. For example, other coins such as Spanish dollar designs depicting King Charles IV, the Maria Theresa thaler, as well as Late Qing dynasty period silver dollars were used as well. Cash coin designs found on snuff-bottles include Ban Liang, Wu Zhu, Huo Quan, Kaiyuan Tongbao, and Guangxu Tongbao cash coins.

Another popular cash coin-based design found on snuff-bottles depict Liu Haichan and the three-legged toad, in these depictions Liu Haichan is often shown with a string of cash coins, the presence of this legendary string of cash coins can be either visible or it could be implied.

== Statues and sculptures ==
=== Baoshan National Mining Park ===
In 2013 a sculpture of a Kaiyuan Tongbao (開元通寳) with a diameter of 24 meters (or 78.7 feet) and a thickness of 3.8 meters (or 12.5 feet) was constructed to be displayed at the Baoshan National Mining Park (宝山国家矿山工园) theme park in the Guiyang Prefecture of Chenzhou, Hunan. The sculpture is notably of a Huichang Kaiyuan Tongbao with the Gui (桂) mint mark.

=== Wuhan ===
There is a 10-meter tall Kaiyuan Tongbao-shaped door which stands on a bridge in the Jiangxia District of Wuhan, Hubei.

=== Changsha ===
There are two large sculptures of Kaiyuan Tongbao cash coins at the entrance of the "Exhibition of Chinese Ancient Coins" (中國歷代錢幣展; 中国历代钱币展; Zhōngguó lìdài qiánbì zhǎn) held at the Ouyang Xun Cultural Park (歐陽詢文化園; 欧阳询文化园; Ōuyáng xún wénhuà yuán), which is located in Shutang, Wangcheng District, Changsha, Hunan, where on 17 August 1992 by Mr. Ceng Jingyi (曾敬儀; 曾敬仪; Céng Jìngyí), a retired teacher and coin collector, had unearthed the world's only known authentic specimen of a Tang dynasty period clay mould.

=== Coin dragon ===
At the Hall of Mental Cultivation in the Forbidden City, Beijing there is a coin dragon (錢龍; 钱龙; Qián lóng) made of Qianlong Tongbao cash coins, this sculpture was created during the reign of the Qianlong Emperor (1735–1796) and was only discovered in 2017 during a renovation of the palace.

== Store signs ==
Cash coin designs are sometimes incorporated in Chinese store signs, known as zhāo pái (招牌). Store signs started appearing in China during the Song dynasty period, and by the Ming and Manchu Qing dynasties Chinese shops had developed several types of store signs to help establish their identity. The earliest known Chinese store signs only consisted of a simple piece of cloth with some Traditional Chinese characters on it which was hung at front of the shop's door. These early Chinese store signs would often, only have things like "tea house", "restaurant", or "drugstore" written on them, while some store signs would have the name of the shop or shop owner on it. Other types of imperial Chinese store displayed a sample of the product being sold by the shop to help identify it. For example, a shoe store might hang a shoe from a pole to show that they sell shoes or a tobacco store may display a large wooden model of a tobacco leaf to indicate that they sold tobacco products.

Another type of Chinese store sign design from this period that became popular was those that included symbols of "good luck" and "prosperity", rather than displaying what line of the business the shop was involved in. These store signs would often be based on ancient Chinese cash coins or display an image of Caishen (the Chinese God of Wealth). While store signs shaped like cash coins were common in the past, in modern Chinese metropolises they have become increasingly rare. Cash coin store signs may still be found in Chinese villages and often don't display any symbols associated with the business, often simply displaying cash coin inscriptions and in some cases Chinese numismatic charm inscriptions like Shouxi Facai (壽喜發財; shòu xǐ fā cái) which translates into English as "longevity, happiness, and make a fortune".

== Terminology of game suits ==
A large variety of Chinese games incorporate terminology based on cash coins and related monetary terms. These include Chinese playing cards (see above) and Mahjong (see above), among many others.

=== List of game terms and their meaning and/or etymology ===
Cash coins themselves were commonly known as "Coppers" (銅) or "Copper money" (銅錢) in daily conversation. The Chinese playing card term "Tong" (同) is both a transformation and abbreviation of the Traditional Chinese character "銅". The German Karl Himly hypothesised that these terms were related in his 1901 paper on Chinese playing cards, this hypothesis is further backed by the fact the term "Tong" (銅) is used as a suit name for a playing card game named Madiao (打吊) in the book Honglou yuanmeng ("Completing the Dream of the Red Chamber") published in 1814, this book being one of the many sequels to the famous Chinese book Honglou Meng ("Dream of the Red Chamber"). The book further documents the cash coin-based terms Kongwen (空文; "Zero Cash"), (Note: In the context of Kongwen (空文; "Zero Cash") the term wén (文) is an abbreviation of Wenqian (文錢).) Zhihua (枝花; "Spray Flower / Half Cash"), and Er Tong (二銅; "Two Cash").

Further references connecting the two characters come from the Hanyu Da Cidian.

"The Hanyu Da Cidian collects just the usages words, whether they were/are, correct/standard or incorrect/nonstandard usages. Thus, if 同 tong was used in the Himly set in lieu of 銅 tong 'copper', so as to denote 'copper' and hence 'copper cash', then that would be an incorrect or nonstandard usage, but still used nevertheless." Under 銅 tong, 'copper', there is an entry: "Abbreviation for copper-made things. copper cash, cash."

— From Cards to Tiles: The Origin of Mahjong(g)'s Earliest Suit Names (The MAHJONG Tile Set) by Michael Stanwick and Hongbing Xu.

The Hanyu Da Cidian entry for "Tong" (同) states that the character can alternatively be read as "Tong" (銅). This is further evidence that the term "同" in Chinese card games is a non-standard way to refer to cash coins.

Two other cash coin-based terms used in game suits is Suo (索; 'a cord'; "string of cash coins") and Wan (萬; "Myriads (of cash coins)"). In this context a "Suo" refers to a string of 100 cash coins, 10 "Suo" is 1 Guan (貫; "To thread") or a string of 1000 cash coins, and a "Wan" is composed of 10 "Guan" making it represent 10.000 brass cash coins, in this understanding the term "Wan" becomes a likely abbreviation for either Wanqian (萬錢) or Wanguan (萬貫). During the 19th century packs of Chinese playing cards from the province of Fujian actually included money-suited decks that used the term "Wanguan".

Ming dynasty period scholar Pan Zhiheng noted in his work Yezi pu ("A Manual of Leaves"), a playing cards manual, that the Myriad gets its name from piling up ten strings of 1000 cash coins. During the Ming Dynasty period the four suits of money-suited decks were called Wenqian (文錢; "Cash"), Suozi (索子; "Strings of Cash"), Wanguan (万貫; "Myriads"), and Shi Wan (十万; "Tens of Myriads").

In his 1901 description on Chinese playing card games the German Karl Himly noted that the term Bing (餅, "cake", often abbreviated to "并") in the Chinese playing card game Shi Hu Pai seemed to have been related to "Cash", as in his observations he noted that one of the ten, three-card combinations, or "Hu", was called Wenqian (文錢), he elaborated a connection between the "Bing" and the "Wenqian" by citing that in the Kangxi Zidian there was a quote that stated:

"Nowadays in Min (now Fujian), Ou (now Wenzhou) and Hu-Nan, (people) cast silver into cakes 餅bing, (with the radical 食 (饣simplified) 'shi', food')] which is just a remnant of 鉼 'bing'" [with the radical 金 'jin', 'metal', as a conceptual symbol – hence 'metal-cake' – as in silver 'cake' (a silver coin)]. Note; 餅 bing can also mean 'shaped like a cake'.

— ‘K’ang-hi Tze-tien’ [Kangxi Zidian] – 1716. With annotations from From Cards to Tiles: The Origin of Mahjong(g)’s Earliest Suit Names (The MAHJONG Tile Set) by Michael Stanwick and Hongbing Xu.

Another reference to "Bing" as a monetary accounting unit is found in the 1878 book Huifanglu ("A Record of Painted Fragrance") by Xi Ling Yeqiao which uses the term "Shi bing fan yin" which translates into English as "Ten cakes of foreign silver". In Shi Hu Pai the term "Wenqian" as the unit as well as a unit of the four and three suited money cards. Since both the terms "Bing" and "Wenqian" were used as units of money and both currencies bore similar round shapes, then this may be the reason why the word "Bing" which normally means "cake" could have been used as an alternative name for the units of the "Cash" suit.

"Tiao" (条) (Note: This is the simplified form of the Traditional Chinese character "條". The simplified form of this character is often used for the "Strings" suits in Chinese playing card games.) is another term that was used to mean "String of cash coins". The term "Tiao" was found in the 1848 book Feng yue meng ("A Dream of Wind and Moon") written by Han Shang Meng Reng. Later it also appeared in the 1908 – 1919 book Guang ling chao ("The Waves of Guangling ") authored by Li Hanqiu. In both of these books the authors used this term for both three-suited games that used tiles and paper cards, the other suits in these games were "Bing" and "Wan". Notably, both of these books were produced in Yangzhou, Jiangsu indicating that this might have been a regional usage of these terms. Even within the province of Jiangsu different terms were used regionally, for example the ~1817 book Jing hua yuan ("Flowers in the Mirror") by Li Ruzhen from Haizhou in Northern Jiangsu used the three suit names "Bing", "Suo", and "Wan". But as Haizhou is close to Yangzhou it can be tentatively proposed that the playing card game term "Tiao" may have appeared in this area of Jiangsu somewhere in the period between the years 1817 and 1848.

The game term "Tiao" might have been derived from the monetary term "Diao" (吊). The term "Diao" was already in use as early as the Ming dynasty, where it was used to mean a string of a thousand brass cash coins. The game term "Tiao" might have been derived from the monetary term "Diao" due to their similar pronunciation.

Alternative hypotheses for the origins of the game term "Tiao" exist, such as that the term was used to count fish but no known historical cards with fish figures from this era are known to exist making this hypothesis highly unlikely. Packs sporting Strings of Fish and "Tiao" (条), together with the abbreviated "Bing" (并), and the simplified Chinese character version of "Wan" (万), did begin to appear during the early 20 century, these packs of cards continued to be produced until the late 20th century, but none have been known to be produced before this century. Another hypothesis is that the term "Tiao" is actually derived from a game term "Diao" and was used due to their similar pronunciation. But no evidence exists that "Diao" was used as a game term during the early 19th century as the earliest reference to "Diao" as a suit term comes from 1890. This information was published in a memorandum by Henry Wilkinson in the year 1925 under the title "Extracts from my unpublished notes" from his 1890 work on Chinese playing cards where he also lists similar terms. For example, instead of "Suo" (索) he lists "Diao" (吊), and instead of the term "Tong" (同) he lists the term "Bing" (餅), and for the third suit Wilkinson uses the simplified term "Wan" (万).

== Token coins ==
=== Plantation tokens in the Dutch East Indies ===
The Sennah Rubber Co. Ltd. on the island of Sumatra, Netherlands East Indies issued machine-struck token coins that were shaped like cash coins. These tokens were made of brass and were denominated in 5 liters of rice (Dutch: 5-liter rijst). They were 30 millimeters in diameter and had a square central hole that was 8.4 millimeters in diameter.

=== Yanshoutang pharmacy tokens ===
In the year 1933 the Yanshoutang (延壽堂) pharmacy in the city of Tianjin issued token coins that were shaped like cash coins. These pharmacy tokens were made from silver and were Ø 32 millimeters. The large obverse inscription around the square centre hole reads Yan Nian Yi Shou (延年益壽) which translates into English as "To live an extended life". The top of the obverse side of the token has the text Yanshoutang Yaopu (延壽堂藥鋪) which means "Yanshoutang pharmacy" written from right to left inside of the rim of the coin. The bottom of the reverse side reads Tianjin Fajie Majialou Nan (天津法界馬家樓南) which translates into English to "South of the Ma (馬) family building, French concession of Tianjin". The large reverse inscription of these silver pharmacy tokens around the square centre hole read Yi Yuan Qian Zeng (一元錢贈), which translates into English as "Gift of 1 yuan". At the top part of the rim it reads Yishi Bo Qi Sun Shengchang Faming (醫士伯岐孫盛昌發明) written from right to left which translates into English as "Doctor Bo Qi and Sun Shengchang inventors", while the inscription at the bottom of the rim reads Kaishi Jinian (開始紀念), which translates as "Commemorating the opening". On the right and left side of the rim are Chinese characters Gui-You (癸酉) which indicates that it was produced in 1933.

=== Tong-in Market Yeopjeon tokens ===
At the Tong-in Market (통인시장), a small market that was established in 1941 during the Japanese occupation period for Seoul's Japanese residents outside of the Gyeongbok Palace, people can purchase token coins shaped like yeopjeon ("leaf coins", the Korean tern for cash coins) at shops which are members of the "Dosirak Café" (도시락) project to spend at around 70 food stores and restaurants. The shops where these yeopjeon tokens can be spent have a sign stating "通 도시락 cafe" and these tokens can be bought in strings of 10 yeopjeon. A single one of these yeopjeon tokens cost ₩500 in 2014.

=== Shingi Tongbo ===
At the Shingi market (신기시장, 新起市場 or 新基市場) located in the city of Incheon, South Korea cash coin-shaped token coins made from brass can be used to pay for items. These tokens have the obverse inscription Shingi Tongbo (新起通寶) and the reverse inscription O Baek (五百, written from left to right), these Chinese characters indicate that each Shingi Tongbo token is equivalent to ₩ 500 (which was valued at $ 0.40 in the year 2019). Foreign visitors are given 6 Shingi Tongbo token coins free of charge when entering the market (as of 2019), tourists are given these cash coin-shaped tokens so that they can experience trading with ancient money.

Furthermore, the entrance to the Shingi market is shaped like an elongated cash coin with the Chinese characters inscribed on it on both ends of the sign and the name of the market written in Hangul in the middle.

=== Mikazuki-mura Edo coins ===
Cash coin tokens are used at the Mikazuki-mura (三日月村) theme park located in the Gunma Prefecture, Kantō region. The theme park is based on a rural village during the Bakumatsu (the late Edo period) and includes a number of attractions such as a house filled with Ninja tricks. On the premises of the Mikazuki-mura theme park visitors have to use "Edo coins" to make purchases as well as to pay for the attractions. These tokens are purchased at a price of 100 yen (円) for 1 mon (文). The tokens are identical to the historical Edo period Kan'ei Tsūhō (寛永通寳) and Tenpō Tsūhō (天保通寳) cash coins, but contain the text "三日月村" (Mikazuki-mura) written very small on their reverse sides.

== Video games ==
The Tenpō Tsūhō (天保通寳) is a collectable item in the 2013 American video game Tomb Raider, which can be obtained inside the Cliffside Bunker on Yamatai.

== Zodiacs ==
The Chinese zodiac "rat" (鼠) is often depicted holding a cash coin. This is because in Chinese folklore, there is a story that once upon a time, five beautiful fairies descended to the world of the mortals and had disguised as rats. These fairies in rat form then gathered sycees and cash coins, and later gave all these treasures to the people. This is why the rats from the Year of the Rat (鼠年) are sometimes referred to as "money-gathering rats".

== Gallery ==
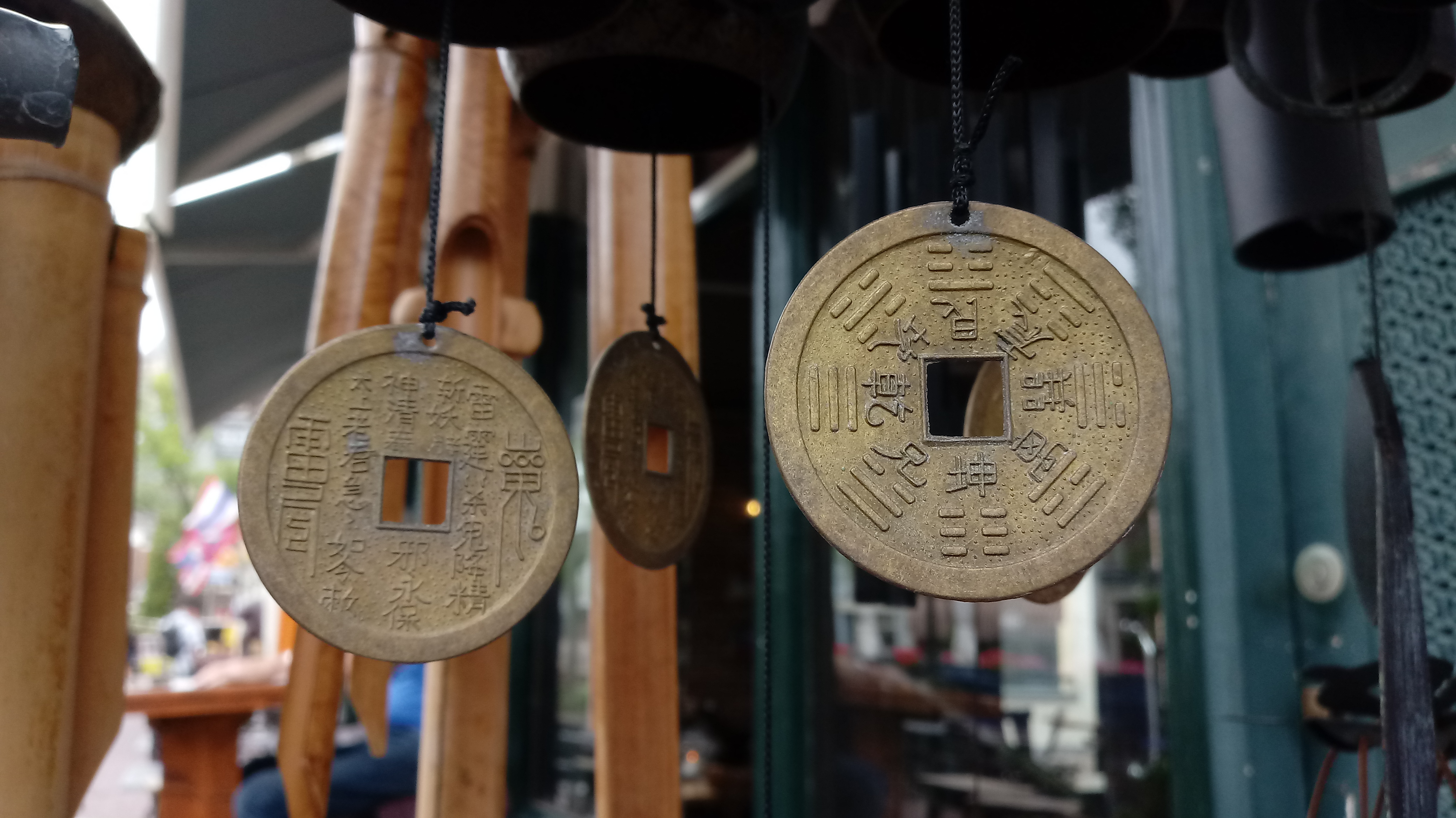
Modern machine-made Lei Ting curse charms containing Daoist imagery in Delft, Netherlands.

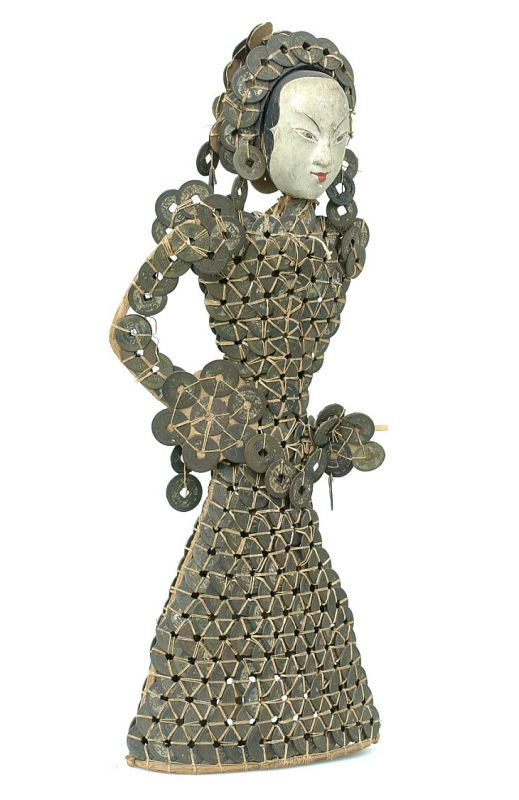
A Balinese statuette of a woman made from Qing dynasty period cash coins on display at the Tropenmuseum, Amsterdam.

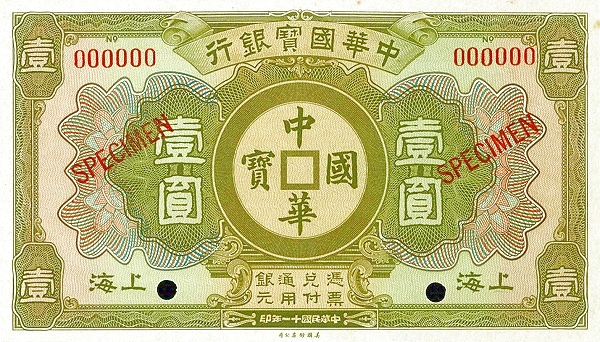
A 1 dollar banknote issued by the Shanghai branch of the China Specie Bank Ltd. in 1922, note that the cash coin inscription reads Zhonghua Guobao (中華國寶), which translates into English as "Chinese national treasure".

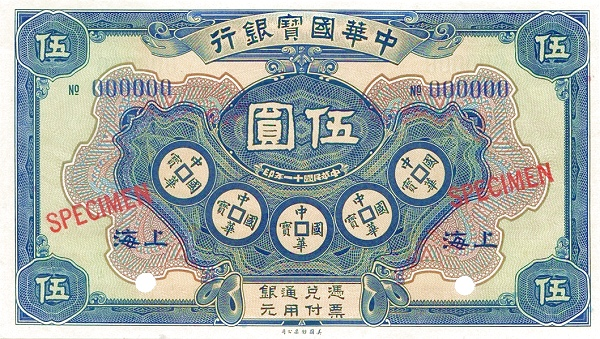
A 5 dollars banknote issued by the Shanghai branch of the China Specie Bank Ltd. in 1922, note that the cash coin inscription reads Zhonghua Guobao (中華國寶), which translates into English as "Chinese national treasure".

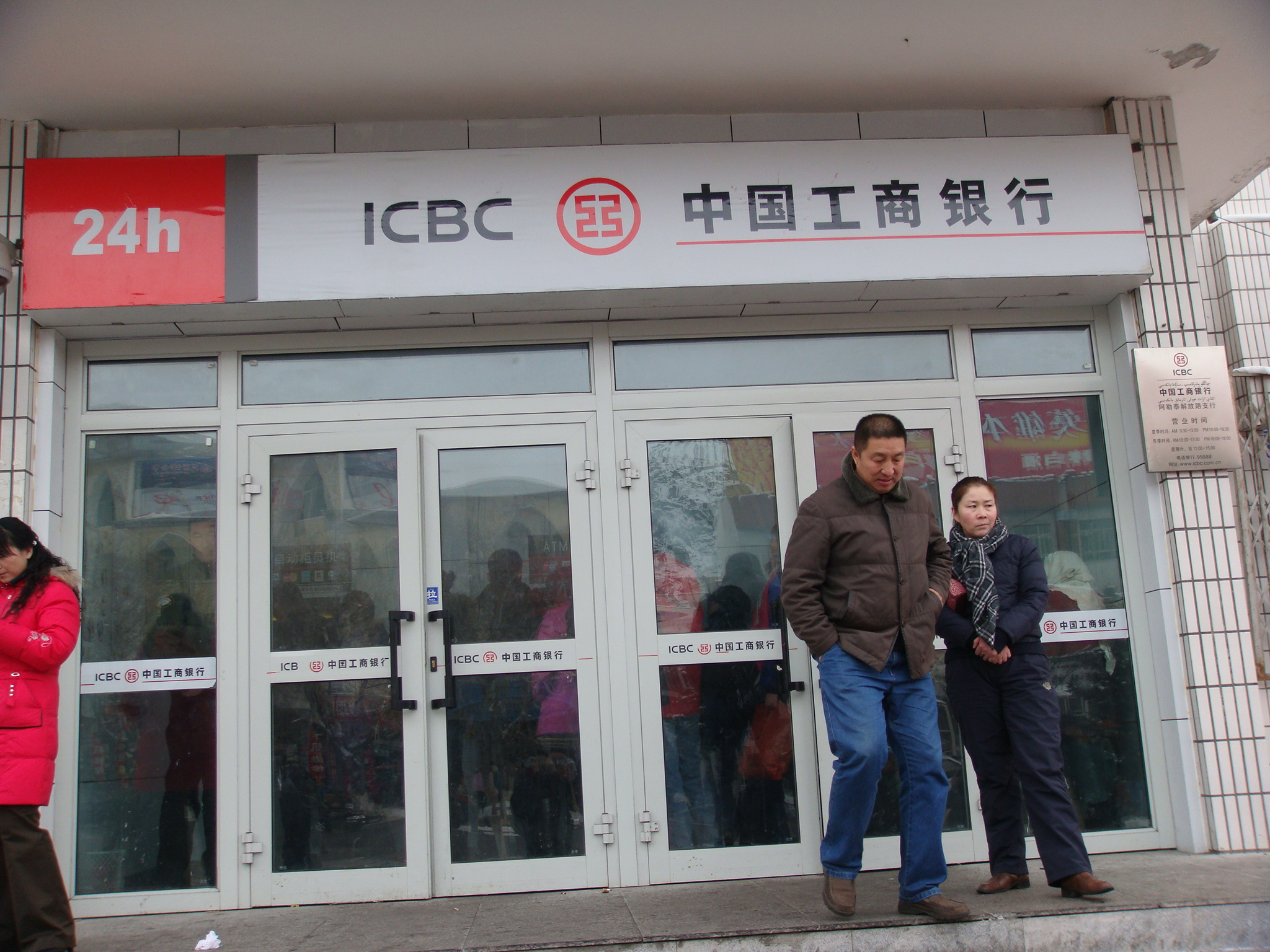
An Industrial and Commercial Bank of China branch office in Altai City, Ili Kazakh Autonomous Prefecture, Xinjiang.

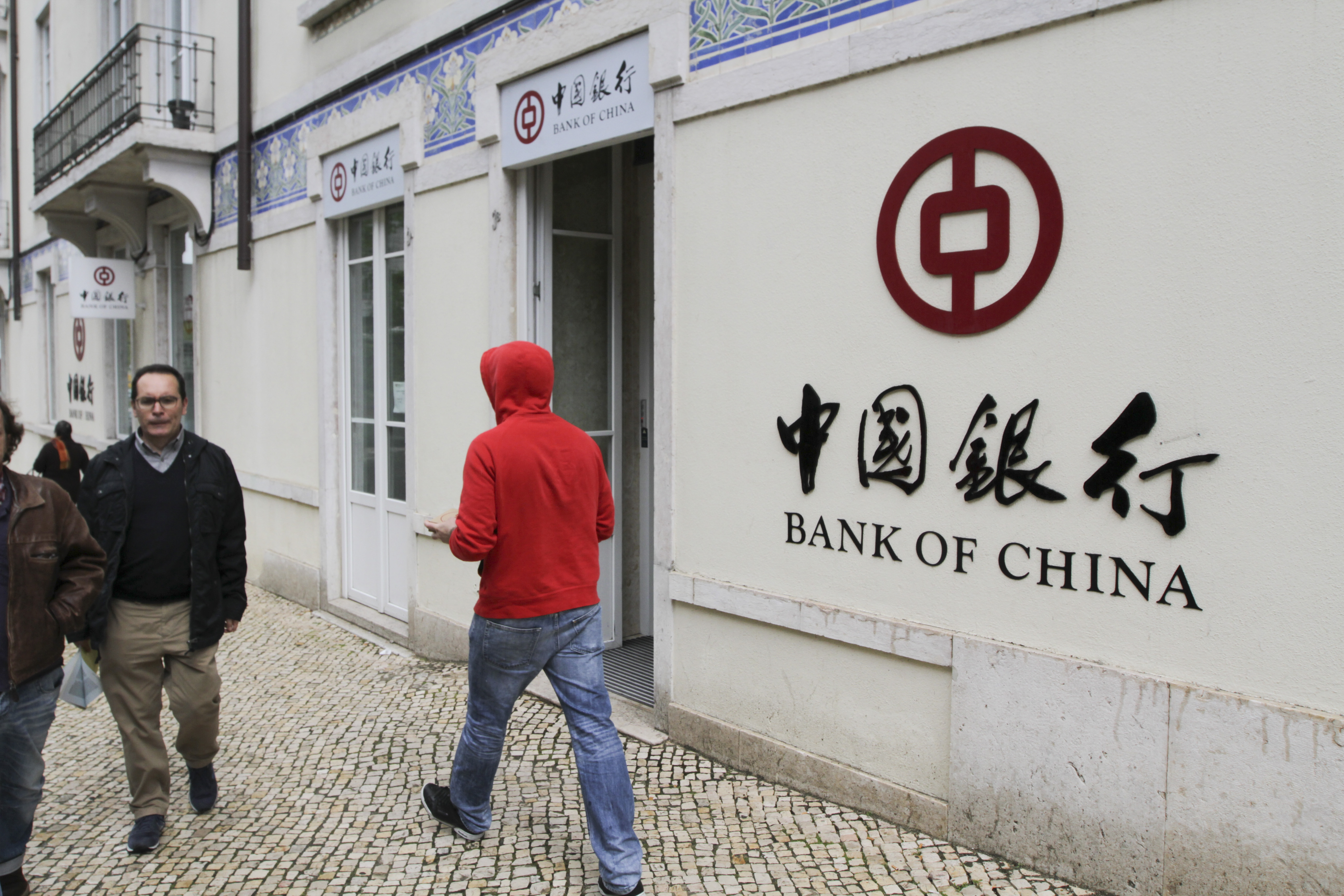
A Bank of China branch office in Lisbon, Portugal.

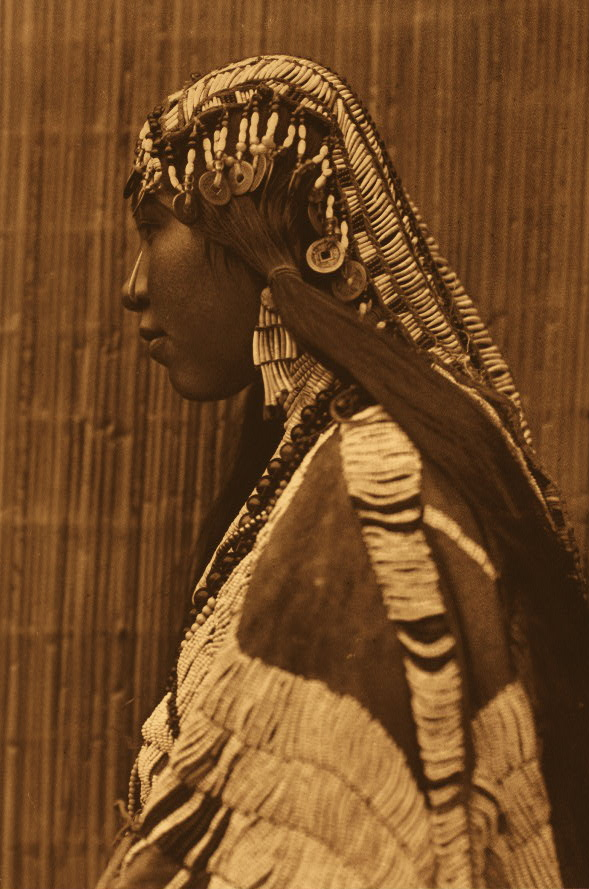
A photograph of a young Wishram woman in bridal garb. Note the Qing dynasty cash coins in her headdress.

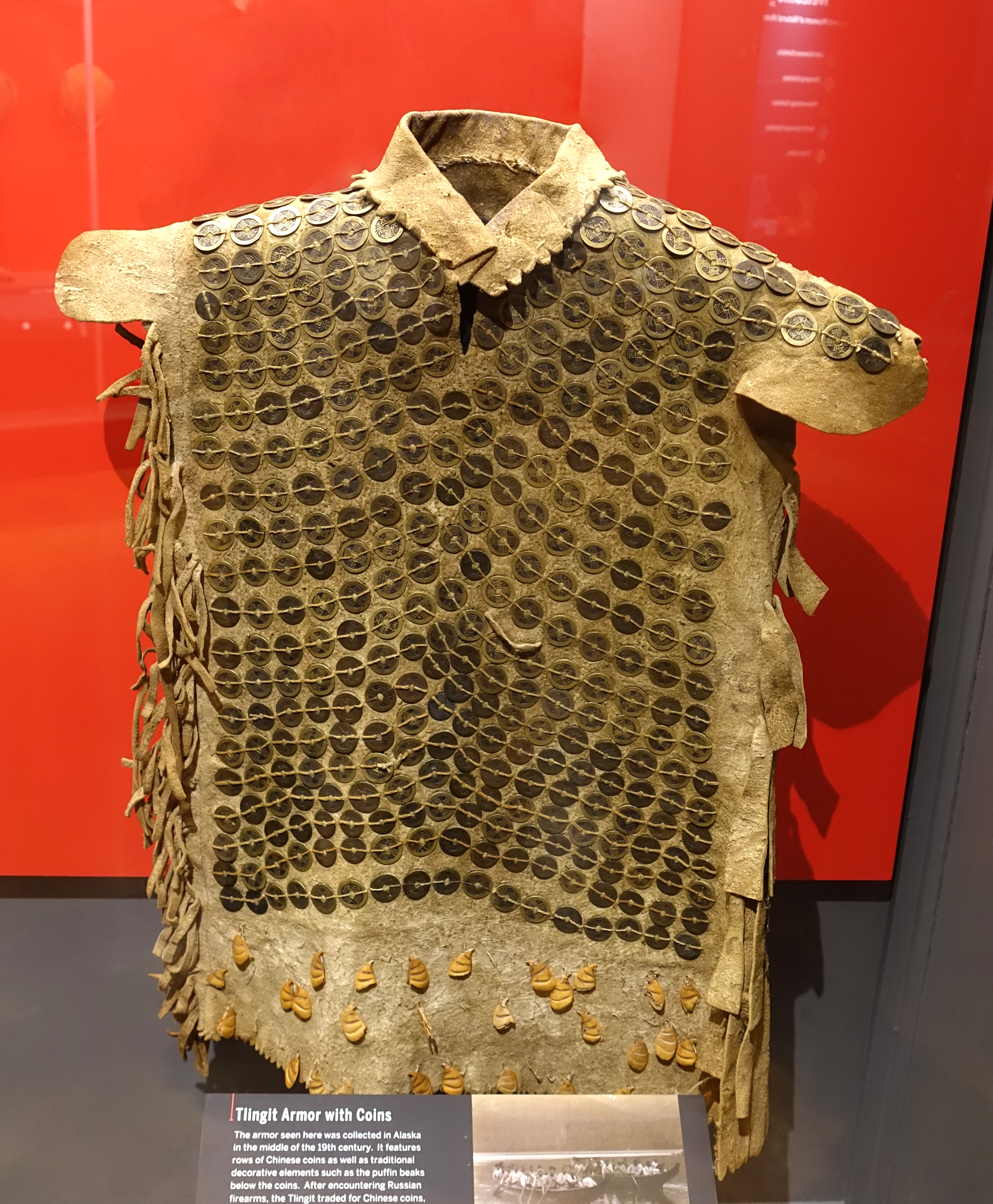
Tlingit body armour made with Chinese cash coins on display at the Peabody Museum of Archaeology and Ethnology, Cambridge, Massachusetts, United States.

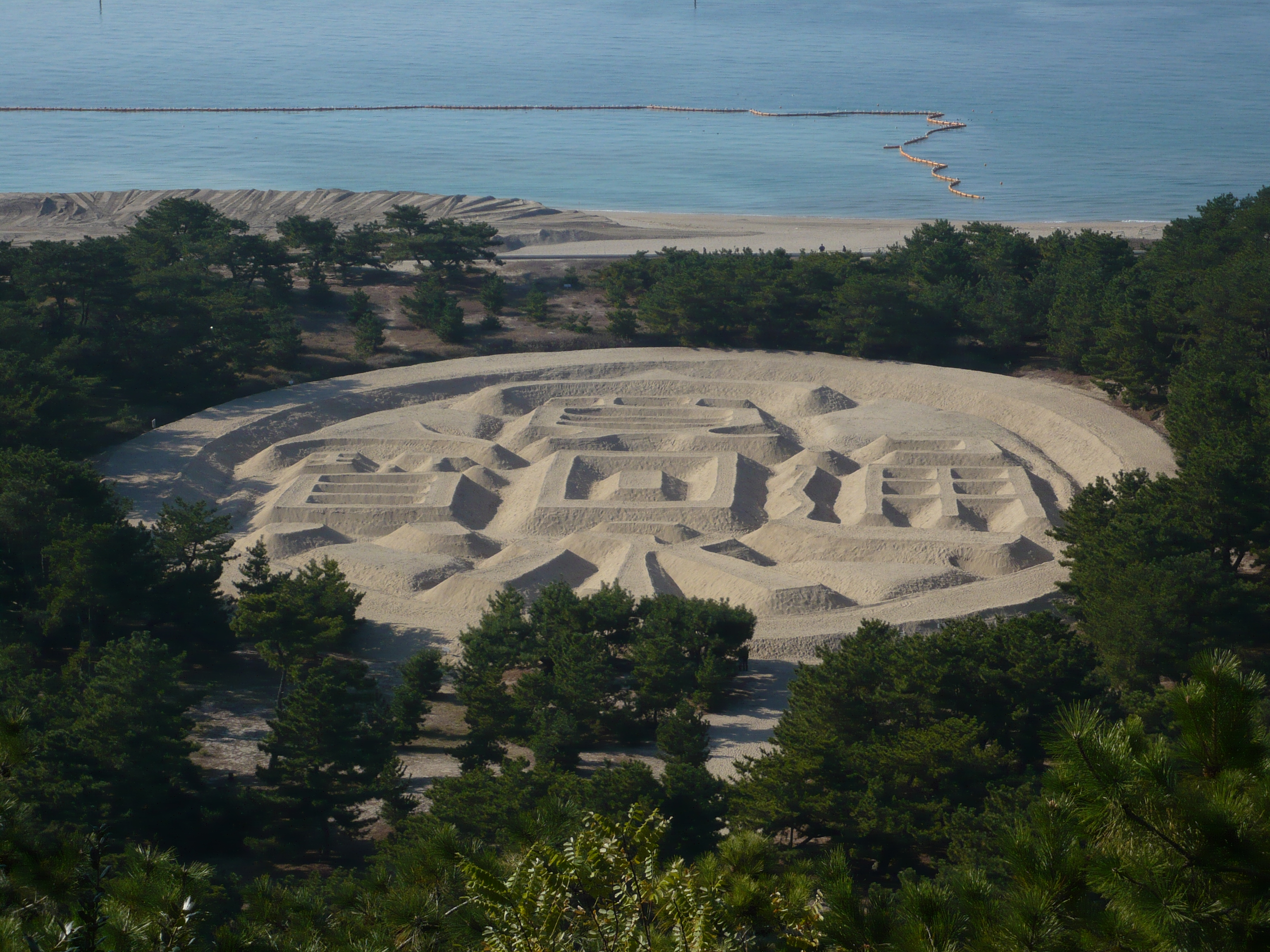
The coin-shaped sand-drawing" or Zenigata suna-e (銭形砂絵) based on the Japanese Kan'ei Tsūhō (寛永通寳) cash coins whose origins date back to 1633 in the Kotohiki Park which lies in Kan'onji, Kagawa Prefecture.

The former flag of Kan'onji, Kagawa.

The former emblem of Kan'onji, Kagawa.

The mon (紋 "family crest") of the Sengoku clan.

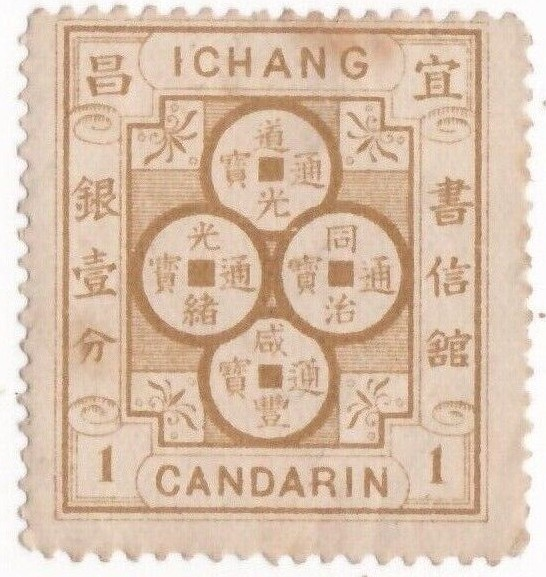
An 1894 postage stamp featuring Daoguang Tongbao (道光通寳), Xianfeng Tongbao (咸豐通寳), Tongzhi Tongbao (同治通寳), and Guangxu Tongbao (光緒通寳) cash coins issued by the city of Yichang, Hubei.

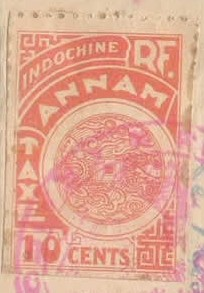
A revenue stamp issued by the French protectorate of Annam (French Indochina) featuring the design of a curled up dragon in the shape of a cash coin.

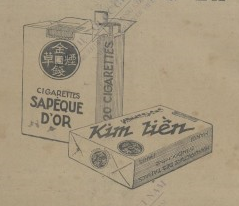
A package of Sapèque d'Or cigarettes featuring the design of a cash coin with the inscription Kim Tiền Yên Thảo (金錢煙草).

== Sources ==
- Hartill, David (22 September 2005). Cast Chinese Coins. Trafford, United Kingdom: Trafford Publishing. ISBN 978-1412054669.
- Hartill, David, Qing cash, Royal Numismatic Society Special Publication 37, London, 2003.
