= Euro gold and silver commemorative coins (France): 2008 =

France has a rich selection of Gold and Silver commemorative coins. These coins are minted by Monnaie de Paris, which is a state owned industrial and commercial company.

== Gold ==
=== €10 ===
Coin Kanei-Tsuho
Designer: Atelier de Gravure		Mint: -	
Value: €10.00	Alloy: Gold 920/1000	Quantity: 3,000	Quality: Proof
Issued: 2008	Diameter: 22	Weight: 8.45	Market Value:
The Franco-Japanese "Treaty of peace, friendship and commerce" was signed on 9 October 1858. It constitutes the first step in Franco-Japanese relations, which are today, both rich and warm. Some years later, France became a model for Japanese modernization. In the same way, Japanese arts such as etchings, painting and ceramics strongly influenced the French art world at the end of the 19th century, giving rise to the Japanese style which would inspire the impressionist movement. During the G8 summit in June 2007, Nicolas Sarkozy and the Prime Minister Shinzo Abe confirmed their intention to establish more amicable and cooperative relations than in the past. Several projects of cooperation and exchange, as well as events in different fields are already scheduled. The representation of a Japanese coin of the time : "Kanei Tsuho". The reverse is common to the entire range, and represents the official logo of this anniversary.
Europa Mintmark : 50th Anniversary of the European Parliament
Designer: Atelier de Gravure		Mint: -	
Value: €10.00	Alloy: Gold 920/1000	Quantity: 3,000	Quality: Proof
Issued: 2008	Diameter: 22	Weight: 8.45	Market Value:
The Europa Mintmark series is a program which is common to European monetary institutes.This year Monnaie de Paris celebrates the 50th year of the European Parliament in Strasbourg. A map of the European Union, surrounded by stars features on the obverse, with the city of Strasbourg symbolised by the Mintmark logo. The reverse features a view of the European Parliament from the opposite bank of the Rhine surrounded by green, symbolising the benches of parliament and the text "Le Parlement Européen, 50 ans". The Mintmark logo affixed to the obverse of this coin endows it with a supplementary value as a collector's item.
Tableau japonais
Designer: Atelier de Gravure		Mint: -	
Value: €10.00	Alloy: Gold 920/1000	Quantity: 3,000	Quality: Proof
Issued: 2008	Diameter: 22	Weight: 8.45	Market Value:
The Franco-Japanese "Treaty of peace, friendship and commerce" was signed on 9 October 1858. It constitutes the first step in Franco-Japanese relations, which are today, both rich and warm. Some years later, France became a model for Japanese modernization. In the same way, Japanese arts such as etchings, painting and ceramics strongly influenced the French art world at the end of the 19th century, giving rise to the Japanese style which would inspire the impressionist movement. During the G8 summit in June 2007, Nicolas Sarkozy and the Prime Minister Shinzo Abe confirmed their intention to establish more amicable and cooperative relations than in the past. Several projects of cooperation and exchange, as well as events in different fields are already scheduled. On the obverse a Japanese painting dating from the era of the treaty : the portrait of "Ichikawa Ebizo IV" (late 17th century). The reverse is common to the entire range, and represents the official logo of this anniversary.
Taleau français
Designer: Atelier de Gravure		Mint: -	
Value: €10.00	Alloy: Gold 920/1000	Quantity: 3,000	Quality: Proof
Issued: 2008	Diameter: 22	Weight: 8.45	Market Value:
The Franco-Japanese "Treaty of peace, friendship and commerce" was signed on 9 October 1858. It constitutes the first step in Franco-Japanese relations, which are today, both rich and warm. Some years later, France became a model for Japanese modernization. In the same way, Japanese arts such as etchings, painting and ceramics strongly influenced the French art world at the end of the 19th century, giving rise to the Japanese style which would inspire the impressionist movement. During the G8 summit in June 2007, Nicolas Sarkozy and the Prime Minister Shinzo Abe confirmed their intention to establish more amicable and cooperative relations than in the past. Several projects of cooperation and exchange, as well as events in different fields are already scheduled. On the obverse a French painting dating from the era of the treaty : an extract from "La Liberté guidant le people" by Eugène Delacroix (1830) The reverse is common to the entire range, and represents the official logo of this anniversary.
Terre Adélie
Designer: Atelier de Gravure		Mint: -	
Value: €10.00	Alloy: Gold 920/1000	Quantity: 500	Quality: Proof
Issued: 2008	Diameter: 22	Weight: 8.45	Market Value:
International Polar Year" a huge scientific gathering concerning questions relating to the North and South Poles, took place in 2007 and 2008. To honour this occasion, Monnaie de Paris issues a series of two coins in two years recalling the two Poles dear to all scientists. In 2007, tribute was paid to Paul-Emile Victor and his 1947 expedition. This year will be the turn of the South Pole. Terre Adélie is a French territory of 432,000 km^{2} situated in the South Pole and Antarctica under French sovereignty since 1959. The obverse features a penguin and offspring. The background is the flag of the territory and Antarctica on which are symbolized Terre Adélie and a representation of the meridians which originate at the South Pole. The reverse features the official logo "Les années polaires internationales", used for each event linked to these scientific gatherings.
YEAR OF THE RAT
Designer: Atelier de Gravure		Mint: -	
Value: €10.00	Alloy: Gold 920/1000	Quantity: 500	Quality: Proof
Issued: 2008	Diameter: 22	Weight: 8.45	Market Value:
Obverse : Representation, of the Rat. The Year of the Rat will start the 7th of Febr Reverse : Portrait of the famous French fabulist Jean de la Fontaine surrounded by the 12 Chinese zodiacal signs, animals which he told marvellous stories about....specially the Rat!

== Silver ==
=== €0.25 ===
YEAR OF THE RAT
Designer: Atelier de Gravure		Mint: -	
Value: €0.25	Alloy: Silver 900/1000	Quantity: 10,000	Quality: Brilliant uncirculated
Issued: 2008	Diameter: 37	Weight: 22.2	Market Value:
Obverse : Representation, of the Rat. The Year of the Rat will start the 7th of Febr Reverse : Portrait of the famous French fabulist Jean de la Fontaine surrounded by the 12 Chinese zodiacal signs, animals which he told marvellous stories about....specially the Rat!

=== €1.50 ===
Coin Kanei-Tsuho
Designer: Atelier de Gravure		Mint: -	
Value: €1.50	Alloy: Silver 900/1000	Quantity: 5,000	Quality: Proof
Issued: 2008	Diameter: 37	Weight: 22.2	Market Value:
The Franco-Japanese "Treaty of peace, friendship and commerce" was signed on 9 October 1858. It constitutes the first step in Franco-Japanese relations, which are today, both rich and warm. Some years later, France became a model for Japanese modernization. In the same way, Japanese arts such as etchings, painting and ceramics strongly influenced the French art world at the end of the 19th century, giving rise to the Japanese style which would inspire the impressionist movement. During the G8 summit in June 2007, Nicolas Sarkozy and the Prime Minister Shinzo Abe confirmed their intention to establish more amicable and cooperative relations than in the past. Several projects of cooperation and exchange, as well as events in different fields are already scheduled. The representation of a Japanese coin of the time : "Kanei Tsuho". The reverse is common to the entire range, and represents the official logo of this anniversary.
Europa Mintmark : 50th Anniversary of the European Parliament
Designer: Atelier de Gravure		Mint: -	
Value: €1.50	Alloy: Silver 900/1000	Quantity: 30,000	Quality: Proof
Issued: 2008	Diameter: 37	Weight: 22.2	Market Value:
The Europa Mintmark series is a program which is common to European monetary institutes.This year Monnaie de Paris celebrates the 50th year of the European Parliament in Strasbourg. A map of the European Union, surrounded by stars features on the obverse, with the city of Strasbourg symbolised by the Mintmark logo. The reverse features a view of the European Parliament from the opposite bank of the Rhine surrounded by green, symbolising the benches of parliament and the text "Le Parlement Européen, 50 ans". The Mintmark logo affixed to the obverse of this coin endows it with a supplementary value as a collector's item.
Tableau français
Designer: Atelier de Gravure		Mint: -	
Value: €1.50	Alloy: Silver 900/1000	Quantity: 5,000	Quality: Proof
Issued: 2008	Diameter: 37	Weight: 22.2	Market Value:
The Franco-Japanese "Treaty of peace, friendship and commerce" was signed on 9 October 1858. It constitutes the first step in Franco-Japanese relations, which are today, both rich and warm. Some years later, France became a model for Japanese modernization. In the same way, Japanese arts such as etchings, painting and ceramics strongly influenced the French art world at the end of the 19th century, giving rise to the Japanese style which would inspire the impressionist movement. During the G8 summit in June 2007, Nicolas Sarkozy and the Prime Minister Shinzo Abe confirmed their intention to establish more amicable and cooperative relations than in the past. Several projects of cooperation and exchange, as well as events in different fields are already scheduled. On the obverse a French painting dating from the era of the treaty : an extract from "La Liberté guidant le people" by Eugène Delacroix (1830) The reverse is common to the entire range, and represents the official logo of this anniversary.
Tableau japonais
Designer: Atelier de Gravure		Mint: -	
Value: €1.50	Alloy: Silver 900/1000	Quantity: 5,000	Quality: Proof
Issued: 2008	Diameter: 37	Weight: 22.2	Market Value:
The Franco-Japanese "Treaty of peace, friendship and commerce" was signed on 9 October 1858. It constitutes the first step in Franco-Japanese relations, which are today, both rich and warm. Some years later, France became a model for Japanese modernization. In the same way, Japanese arts such as etchings, painting and ceramics strongly influenced the French art world at the end of the 19th century, giving rise to the Japanese style which would inspire the impressionist movement. During the G8 summit in June 2007, Nicolas Sarkozy and the Prime Minister Shinzo Abe confirmed their intention to establish more amicable and cooperative relations than in the past. Several projects of cooperation and exchange, as well as events in different fields are already scheduled. On the obverse a Japanese painting dating from the era of the treaty : the portrait of "Ichikawa Ebizo IV" (late 17th century). The reverse is common to the entire range, and represents the official logo of this anniversary.
Terre Adélie
Designer: Atelier de Gravure		Mint: -	
Value: €1.50	Alloy: Silver 900/1000	Quantity: 5,000	Quality: Proof
Issued: 2008	Diameter: 37	Weight: 22.2	Market Value:
International Polar Year" a huge scientific gathering concerning questions relating to the North and South Poles, will take place in 2007 and 2008. To honour this occasion, Monnaie de Paris issues a series of two coins in two years recalling the two Poles dear to all scientists. In 2007, tribute was paid to Paul-Emile Victor and his 1947 expedition. This year will be the turn of the South Pole. Terre Adélie is French territory of 432,000 km^{2} situated in the South Pole and Antarctica under French sovereignty since 1959. The obverse features a penguin and offspring. The background is the flag of the territory and Antarctica on which are symbolized Terre Adélie and a representation of the meridians which originate at the South Pole. The reverse features the official logo "Les années polaires internationales", used for each event linked to these scientific gatherings.
