= Kan'ei Tsūhō =

Former currency in Japan

Kan'ei Tsūhō (寛永通寳)
- Tokugawa shogunate (Japan)
- Value: 1 mon, 4 mon
- Composition: Copper-alloy (bronze or brass), Iron
- Years of minting: 1626–1868 (1 mon); 1768–1868 (4 mon)

Obverse
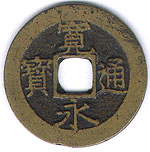
- Design: 寛永通寳 (Romaji: Kan'ei Tsūhō)
- Design date: 1626 (Mito domain); 1636 (Tokugawa shogunate)

Reverse
- Design: Occasionally blank, sometimes with mintmarks (1 mon); 1768: 21 waves; 1769–1868: 11 waves (4 mon)

The Kan'ei Tsūhō (Kyūjitai: 寛永通寳; Shinjitai: 寛永通宝) was a Japanese mon coin in use from 1626 until 1868 during the Edo period. In 1636, the Kan'ei Tsūhō coin was introduced by the Tokugawa shogunate to standardise and maintain a sufficient supply of copper coinage, and it was the first government-minted copper coin in 700 years. The government adopted the coin after its successful introduction in the Mito domain ten years prior in 1626, the third year of the Kan'ei era. These coins would become the daily currency of the common people and would be used for small payments.

Due to the isolationist policies of the Tokugawa shogunate, the outflow of currency halted and Kan'ei Tsūhō coins would continue to stay the main coin circulating in Japan. Kan'ei Tsūhō were minted for 230 years despite the fact that the Kan'ei era ended in 1643. Kan'ei Tsūhō coins would continue to bear the Kan'ei legend, even when a new denomination of the coin was introduced a century later. They were not all uniform as the shogunate had intended, as the mintage was outsourced to regional and local merchants who would cast them at varying weights and sizes, as well as occasionally with local mint marks. By the 1650s, 16 private mints were operating for the production of Kan'ei Tsūhō coins all over Japan. In 1738, the government authorised the manufacture of iron Kan'ei Tsūhō 1 mon coins, and in 1866 (just before the end of the Edo period) iron 4 mon Kan'ei Tsūhō were authorised. While iron coins were being minted the quality of copper coins would decrease due to frequent debasements.

== 1 mon Kan'ei Tsūhō coins ==
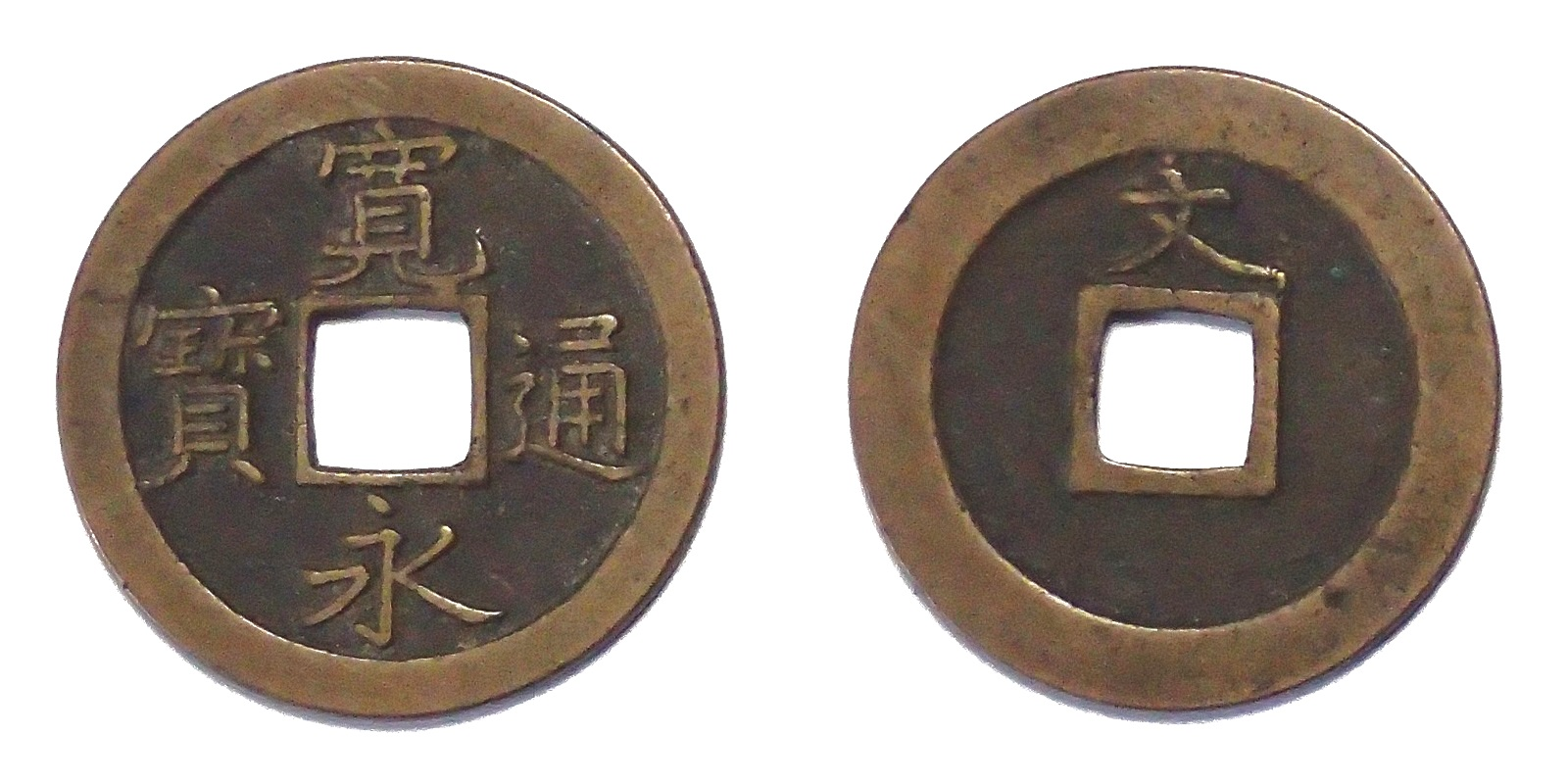
A Kan'ei Tsūhō produced in the year Kanbun 8 (1668).

The peace in Japan after 1615 had a tremendous effect on the Japanese economy. These beneficial circumstances in the economy boosted trade which raised the demand for money by merchants and other traders in order to keep the commerce growing, The alternate attendance system forced the daimyō to reside every other year in the Tokugawa capital of Edo and these daimyō would spend vast quantities of money there. Copper, gold and silver mines were opened up all over Japan and the monetary system of the Tokugawa shogunate established separate mints for copper, silver, and gold coinages.

The original 1 mon Kan'ei Tsūhō was produced by the Mito domain in 1626 in minor quantities, this happened in response to the booming economy Japan had experienced to meet the demand for circulating copper coins. In 1636 the government of the Tokugawa shogunate ordered that these Kan'ei Tsūhō coins be minted in large numbers and model coins were distributed to subcontractors all over Japan with the tax being payable proportionate of the amount produced to ensure that they would be produced in sufficient quantities and started producing them at the mint of Edo and in Sakamoto in the Ōmi province, the shogunate also sent mother coins of the Kan'ei Tsūhō to the Mito Domain, the Sendai Domain, the Mikawa Province (Yoshida Domain), the Echizen province (Takada Domain), the Matsumoto Domain, the Okayama Domain, the Nagato Province, and to the Bungo Province (Nakagawa). Controlled management of the production brought stability to the copper currency of the Tokugawa shogunate which allowed the government to temporarily suspend production in 1640. By the 1650s Kan'ei Tsūhō coins were already being produced at sixteen different locations, even though the Kan'ei era stopped in 1643 these coins continued to be manufactured, during the same year the Tokugawa government issued an edict against the illegal production of copper cash coins. Due to a shortage in copper from 1656 until 1660 only 300,000 Kan'ei Tsūhō cash coins were produced at Torigoe in Edo and 200,000 at Kutsunoya in Suruga. 1 mon Kan'ei Tsūhō coins produced before 1688 are referred to as "old Kan'ei" and are recognisable by their similar calligraphic styles making them hard to differentiate from one another, meanwhile Kan'ei Tsūhō coins produced after 1688 (or "new Kan'ei" coins) tend to be more diverse in calligraphic styling. Most issues of Kan'ei Tsūhō only ran between three and five years from their introduction. The first type of the "new Kan'ei" coins had a mintage of 1,970,000 cash coins and were minted from 1668 until 1684 at Kameido in Edo. As these have the inscription "bun" (文) of the Kanbun era (1661–1673) on their reverses, for this reason they are informally known as Bunsen (文銭). They became an accepted measuring unit, to the point that even the length of socks was measured in Bunsen coins.

Copper mines began to run out in Japan during the early eighteenth century, which made the metal more scarce causing its value to increase. This in turn caused the price to manufacture cash to increase, and eventually the nominal value of the coins became lower than their intrinsic value. One response to this situation was creating iron Kan'ei Tsūhō coins. The first time that the government of the Tokugawa shogunate allowed for this development was in 1739, at which time Kan'ei Tsūhō made from copper alloys were only being produced in smaller numbers. The copper-alloy Kan'ei Tsūhō that were still being produced weighed less and were of inferior quality to those produced before them. As the price of copper remained high, most 1 mon Kan'ei Tsūhō still being produced were made of iron while most copper-alloy coins that were being produced were Kan'ei Tsūhō with a face value of 4 mon, and from 1835 Tenpō Tsūhō cash coins with a face value of 100 mon. Iron Kan'ei Tsūhō coins tend to have less clear inscriptions and the features of these coins such as their inner and outer rims tend to be less fine and are often jagged and unfiled because iron is more difficult to cast. Due to the nature of iron these coins also tend to suffer from oxidation very easily. From 1866 during the Bakumatsu new iron Kan'ei Tsūhō of 4 mon were introduced as inflation had become prevalent.

1 mon Kan'ei Tsūhō produced after 1688 can easily be attributed because of things like mint marks, rim markings, different calligraphic styles and in rare cases accidental markings on the mother coin.

== 4 mon Kan'ei Tsūhō coins ==
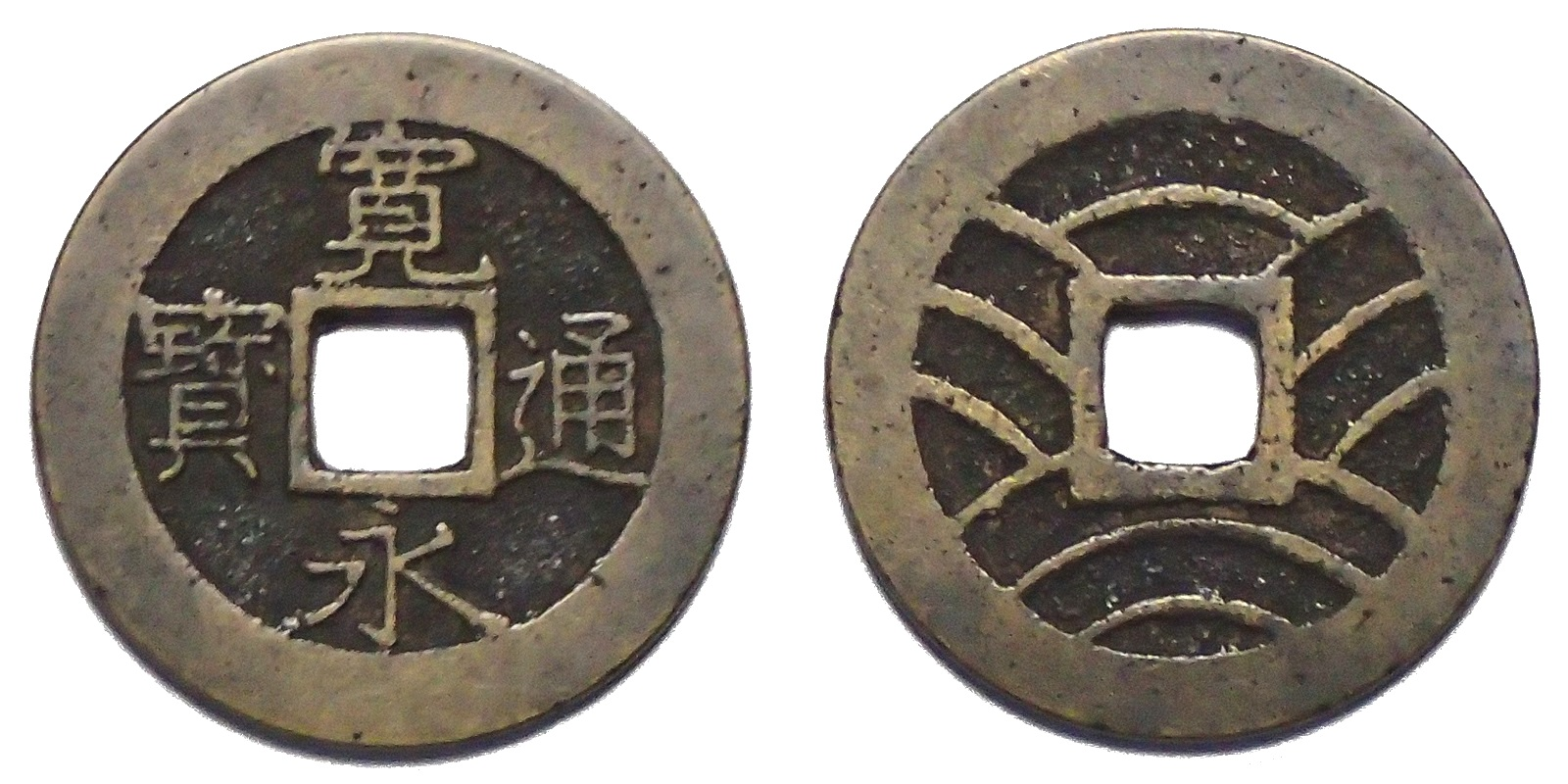
A Kan'ei Tsūhō cash coin with a nominal value of 4 mon.

In 1768 the chamberlain Tanuma Okitsugu commissioned the creation of a brass Kan'ei Tsūhō cash coin with a face value of 4 mon, the initial version was cast at the Fukugawa mint in the capital city of Edo and had an iconic design with 21 waves on its reverse, the following year the reverse design was changed to only have 11 waves and all following versions of the 4 mon Kan'ei Tsūhō had this design. Brass cash coins were made from an alloy of copper and zinc, these cash had been manufactured in China from the late Ming dynasty onwards, however, because zinc was not available in Japan and had to be imported were not being produced in Japan prior. From this point on, the subcontract system for the minting of bronze cash coins came to an end and the Ginza Mint in Edo had received a monopoly over the production of 4 mon Kan'ei Tsūhō brass cash coins. The 4 mon coin was notably only 2 millimeters bigger than the 1 mon Kan'ei Tsūhō cash coin making it cheaper to produce and getting more nominal value out of a comparable amount of copper, as copper had become more scarce in Japan at the time these Kan'ei Tsūhō cash coins of 4 mon became more commonly produced because of their relative cost efficiency in respect to the lower denomination. As the economy was still growing the Japanese population accepted these coins at their face value because of the strong demand for (circulating) currency. The government of the Tokugawa shogunate requested a large number of these 4 mon coins to be cast between the years of 1821 and 1825 which falls within the Bunsei period and are therefore dubbed "Bunsei" coins as opposed to the earlier produced "Meiwa coins", the Bunsei era 4 mon cash coins produced in this period are of variable quality with a large quantity of them being of less than desirable workmanship while they still appear largely identical, the Bunsei era 4 mon cash coins also tend to have a more reddish colour due to the fact that their alloys contained more different types of metals other than copper. 4 mon Bunei Kan'ei coins are just as common as those produced during the Meiwa period. Another type of 4 mon Kan'ei Tsūhō coins are the Ansei Kan'ei produced during the Ansei era (1854–1859), these coins to be more yellowish due to the fact that they were made from brass as opposed to bronze and gave rough faces while they have very clear file marks. In 1860 the government of the Tokugawa shogunate allowed for the production of iron Kan'ei Tsūhō coins due to extreme financial difficulties, but the attempt to mint iron cash coins failed due to the fact that iron is prone to oxidation making them difficult to use leading to them being quite uncommon. Due to the fact that it was very profitable to make Kan'ei Tsūhō cash coins of 4 mon many counterfeits were produced by both illegal private mints and mints operated by clandestine daimyō's. From 1866 the government of the Tokugawa shogunate started giving domains official permission to cast iron 4 mon Kan'ei Tsūhō cash coins with their own finances, these coins can easily be differentiated by special markings on their back to identify the mint of origin. Concurrently as the government of the Tokugawa shogunate started to allow local domains to issue their own 4 mon Kan'ei Tsūhō coins they themselves started minting the Bunkyū Eihō (文久永宝) cash coin from 1863, the inscription on the coin refers to the Bunkyū era (1861–1864), Eihō (永宝) could be translated as "eternally circulating treasure" indicating a very hopeful name for the new series which did not come into fruition as the Japanese mon was superseded by the yen during the Meiji restoration. Like the 4 mon Kan'ei Tsūhō the Bunkyū Eihō were not produced at copper mints but at the silver and gold mints of the shogunate, they had a reverse design of 11 waves but tended to weigh less due to the fact that the price of copper was still rising.

== Cultural impact ==
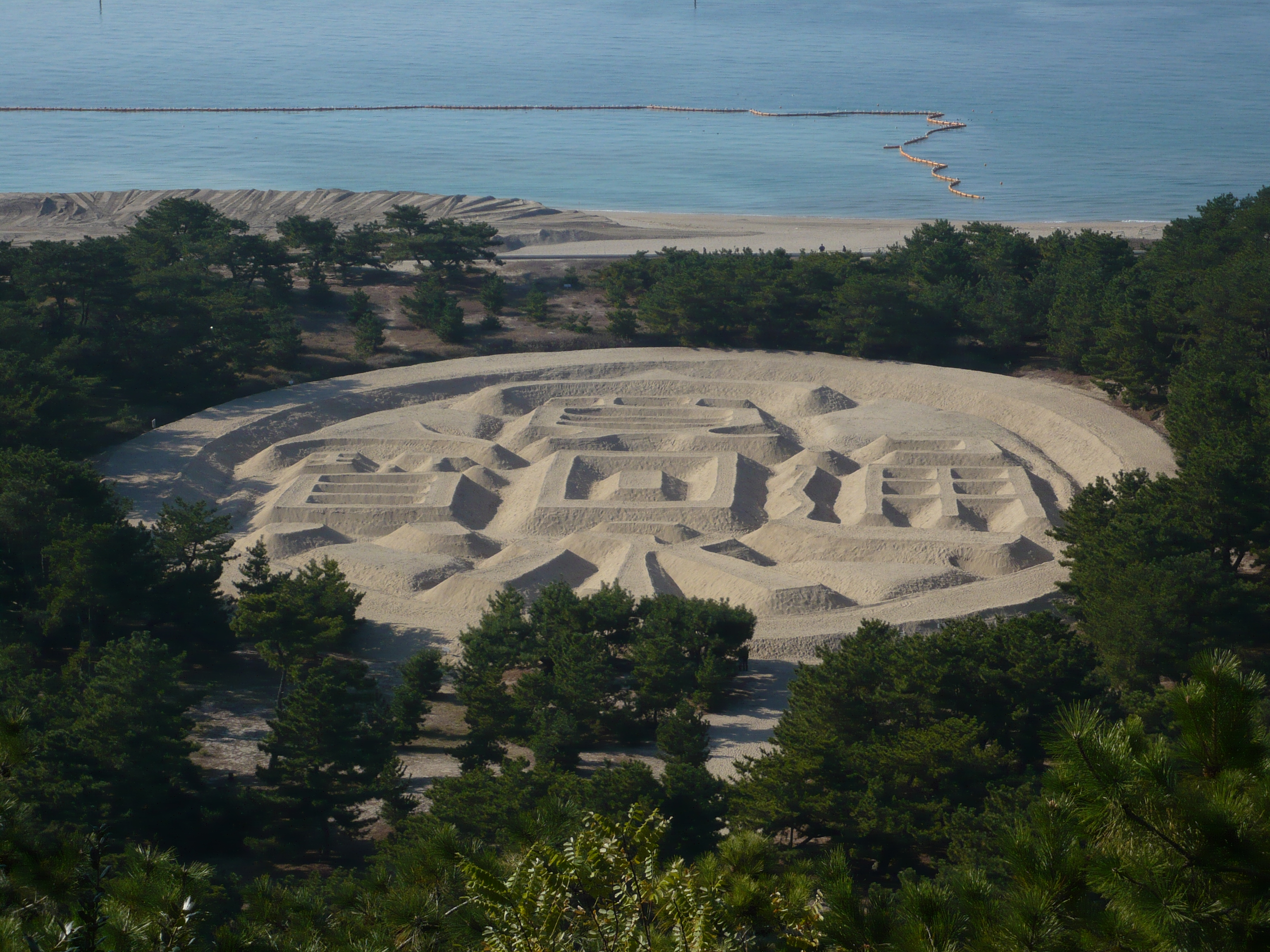
Sand sculpture of a Kan'ei Tsuho built in 1633 (Kan-onji, Kagawa)

- Many variety shops in Edo period Japan were called "4 mon shops" (四文屋, Shimonya) because customers could buy any product in the shop for only 4 mon, this name is still used in modern-day Japan alongside the term "100-yen shop" for stores that sell cheap snacks.
- In 2008 France issued two commemorative coins that featured an image of a Kan'ei Tsūhō cash coin on its reverse, one was a silver coin with a nominal value of €1.50 and the other was a gold coin with a nominal value of €10.
- A large sand sculpture of a Kan'ei Tsūhō, called the Zenigata suna-e (銭形砂絵), was built in 1633, in the city of Kan'onji, Kagawa Prefecture. It has been maintained since then.
- The British Museum collection contains a lot of Kan'ei Tsūhō cash coins, including some made of silver and some which carry numerals on the reverse, the latter were not intended for use as an official currency but were likely used as gifts to commemorate the opening of a new mint.
- Imitations of Kan'ei Tsūhō cash coins are used at the Mikazuki-mura (三日月村) theme park located in the Gunma Prefecture, Kantō region. The theme park is based on a rural village during the Bakumatsu (the late Edo period). These token cash coins contain the text "三日月村" (Mikazuki-mura) written very small on the rim of their reverse sides to indicate that it's a token produced by the park.
