= Mumonginsen =

Early form of Japanese currency

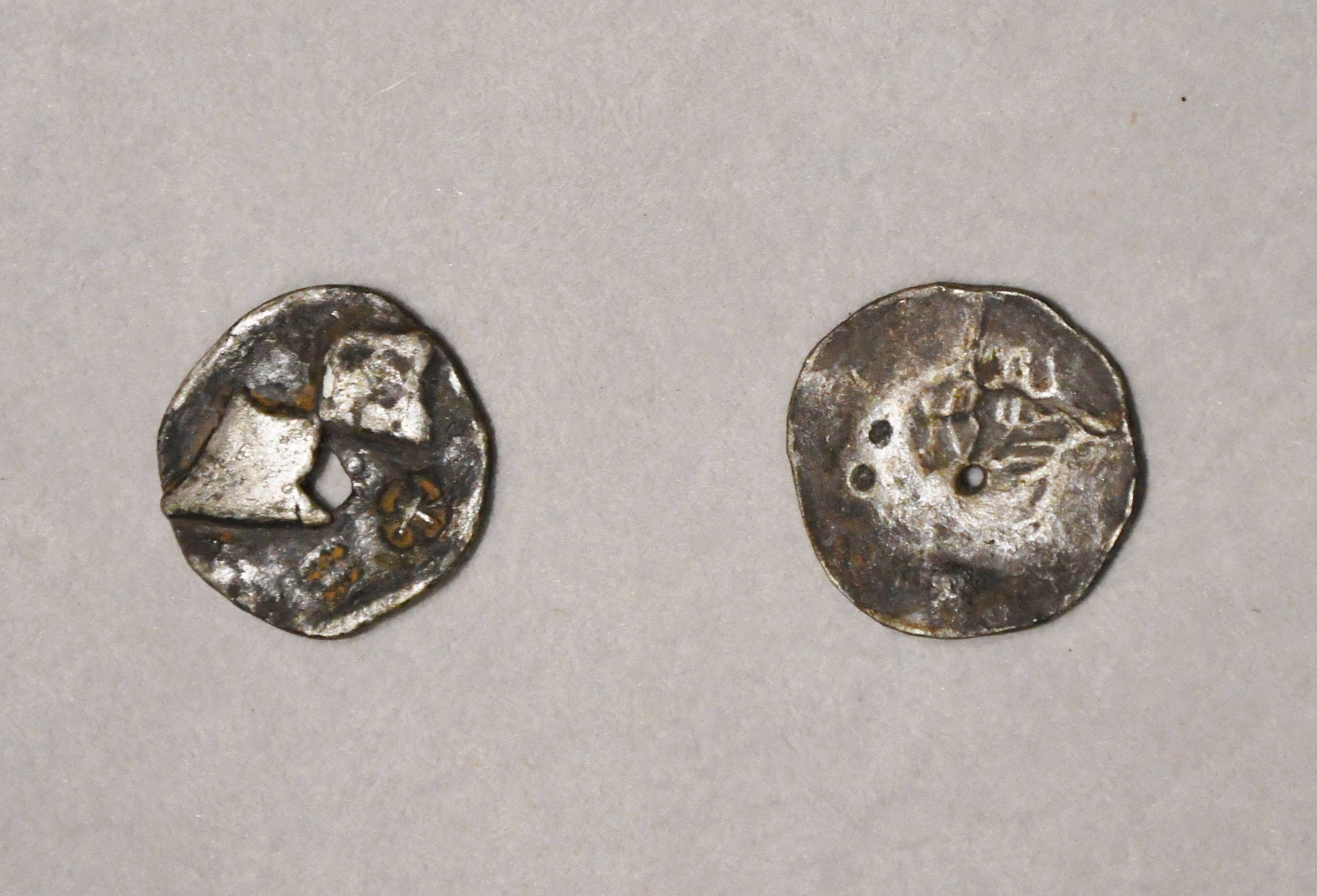
Replica of a Mumon ginsen coin exhibited at the National Museum of Japanese History

Mumon ginsen (無文銀銭) (aka "Plain silver coin") is believed to be the earliest form of Japanese currency. Issued between 667 and 672 AD during the Tenji period, there are theories that mainly lean towards these coins being privately minted.

== Overview ==
Throughout their search history stretching back to the Enkyō period, about 120 Mumon ginsen have been excavated from 17 sites: seven in Yamato, six in Omi, and one each in the Settsu, Kawachi, Yamashiro, and Ise regions. (Note: These regions are now known as: Nara, Shiga, Osaka (for Settsu and Kawachi), Kyoto, and Mie.) Each coin is roughly 3 centimeters in diameter, 2 millimeters thick, and weighs about 8 to 10 grams. (Note: These coins were worth 6 shu in the unit of measurement at the time (1 ryo was equal to 24 shu)) These coins differ from later issues as they feature small round holes as opposed to a large central square. Only a few of those excavated have inscriptions, and many of the coins have silver pieces attached to their surfaces which are thought to have been added to make the weight uniform. All of the coins are thought to have been issued during the reign of Emperor Tenji during the Tenji period based on a written account in the Nihon Shoki. An entry for 683 AD states: "Summer, 4th month, 15th day. The Emperor made a decree; saying:-"Henceforth copper coins must be used, and not silver coins". This decree meant that the coins were issued before the Fuhonsen. Another indicator of dating is the large amount of coins that were excavated from Ōmi Province which suggests a connection to Ōmi Ōtsu Palace.

In contrast to Japan, silver coins were not used on the Korean Peninsula during the Tenji period. Professor Fumio Tanaka (Waseda University) mentions that in Silla, Baekje, and Goguryeo, the use of gold and silver was regulated by royal authority. Tanaka went on to say that it's been proven by literature and archaeology that they functioned as a symbol of the royal authority's status order. When compared to Japan at the time, Tanaka mentions that before the 7th century gold and silver were supplied by the international community. As each powerful clan (chief) obtained these precious resources, there was a basis to circulate coins in a multilateral manner without being regulated by the royal authority.

== Purpose ==
The true purpose of Mumonginsen has been debated by several historians and scholars since at least the Taishō era. There is now a consensus that Mumonginsen at the very least were recognized as having value as currency.

Japanese historian Ginzo Uchida (1872-1919) suggested that the silver coins dated to the Tenmu period, and were likely not officially minted coins made by the government. Instead he theorized that the coins were made by private individuals in Japan using silver produced in Korea. Japanese historian Shinji Nishimura (1879-1943) referred to entries in the 12th year of the Hakuhō period for the silver mining in Tsushima. While he came to the conclusion that the coins may have been used as a type of ornament, the amount of "ornaments" found (100+ pieces) made it difficult to understand. He also suggested that it would be better to think of them as a type of currency. Kanichi Kuroda of the Oriental Numismatic Association argued that Mumonginsen were coin-shaped items with a small circular hole. He then stated that there was no reason for the state to cast such a crude coin when minting them for the first time. Historian Aoyama Reishi stated in his opinion that even if they weren't currency, Mumonginsen must be recognized as transitional circulating coinage. In his reasoning the approximately 100 excavated coins have little variation in weight, and there are too many of them to have been buried as offerings at Shinpo-ji (眞寳院の). (see: "Excavated examples" section below) Japanese archaeologist and professor Keiji Matsumura points out that the remains at the ruins sites (where the coins were found) has generally been either discarded or deliberately buried. Since it's difficult to imagine that something as valuable as silver would have been discarded, he suggests that the undeclared silver coins are biased toward those used as altar implements which wouldn't mean they were numismatic charms.

== Excavated examples ==
Year found	Location (historical)	Location (modern)	Short summary
Enkyō	Ōsumi	Kagoshima	An unknown amount of coins were found.
1761	Settsu	Osaka	Around 100 pieces were initially found at Shinpo-ji (眞寳院の) temple, but only 2 now remain.
1873	Yamato	Nara (city)	Photo of coins found in Tsuge village.
1940	Ōmi	Shiga	12 coins were excavated from the ruins of Sūfuku-ji temple, 1 is now missing.
1956	Kawachi	Kashiwara	Photo from Funabashi ruins.
1958	Yamato	Asuka	Photo from the ruins of Kawahara Temple.
1976	Yamoto	Asuka	Photo from Asukakyo.
1976	Ise	Suzuka	Photo from Kitano Kofun.
1985	Yamoto	Kashihara	1 coin found from Rokujo Sanbo with some of its edges scraped off.
1986	Yamoto	Asuka	Photo from Ishigami Ruins.
1987	Ōmi	Ōtsu	Photo from the Karahashi ruins.
1988	Ōmi	Moriyama	Photo from the Akanoiwanminami ruins.
1988	Ōmi	Rittō	Photo from the Kitsunezuka ruins.
1994	Yamoto	Sakurai	Photo from the Tani ruins, shows a sectioned fragment.
1994	Yamashiro	Kyoto	Photo from the Ogura Bettocho ruins.
1995	Ōmi	Kōra	Photo from the Amago Nishi ruins.
1997	Yamato	Nara (city)	Photo from Nijo-sanbo.
1998	Yamoto	Asuka	6 pieces of one coin were found at the Asukaike ruins.
2004	Ōmi	Rittō	Photo from the Reisenji ruins.

== See also ==
- List of Japanese cash coins by inscription
- Kaiyuan Tongbao - concurrent Chinese coinage.
- Wadōkaichin - Japanese coinage from 708 to 958
- Kaiki Shoho - Japanese coinage from 760
- Taihei Genpō - Japanese coinage from 760
- Mannen Tsūhō - Japanese coinage from 760 to 765
