= Fuhonsen =

Fuhonsen (富本銭) aka Futōsen (富夲銭) is an early form of Japanese currency that was created around 683 (Tenmu 12) during the Asuka period. Its suggested that these coins were minted before the creation of the Wadōkaichin in 708 based on an entry in the Nihon Shoki. Theories differ as to whether this coin actually circulated or was used as a Chinese numismatic charm. While Mumonginsen preceded these coins, there are still many unanswered questions regarding their functions.

== Overview ==
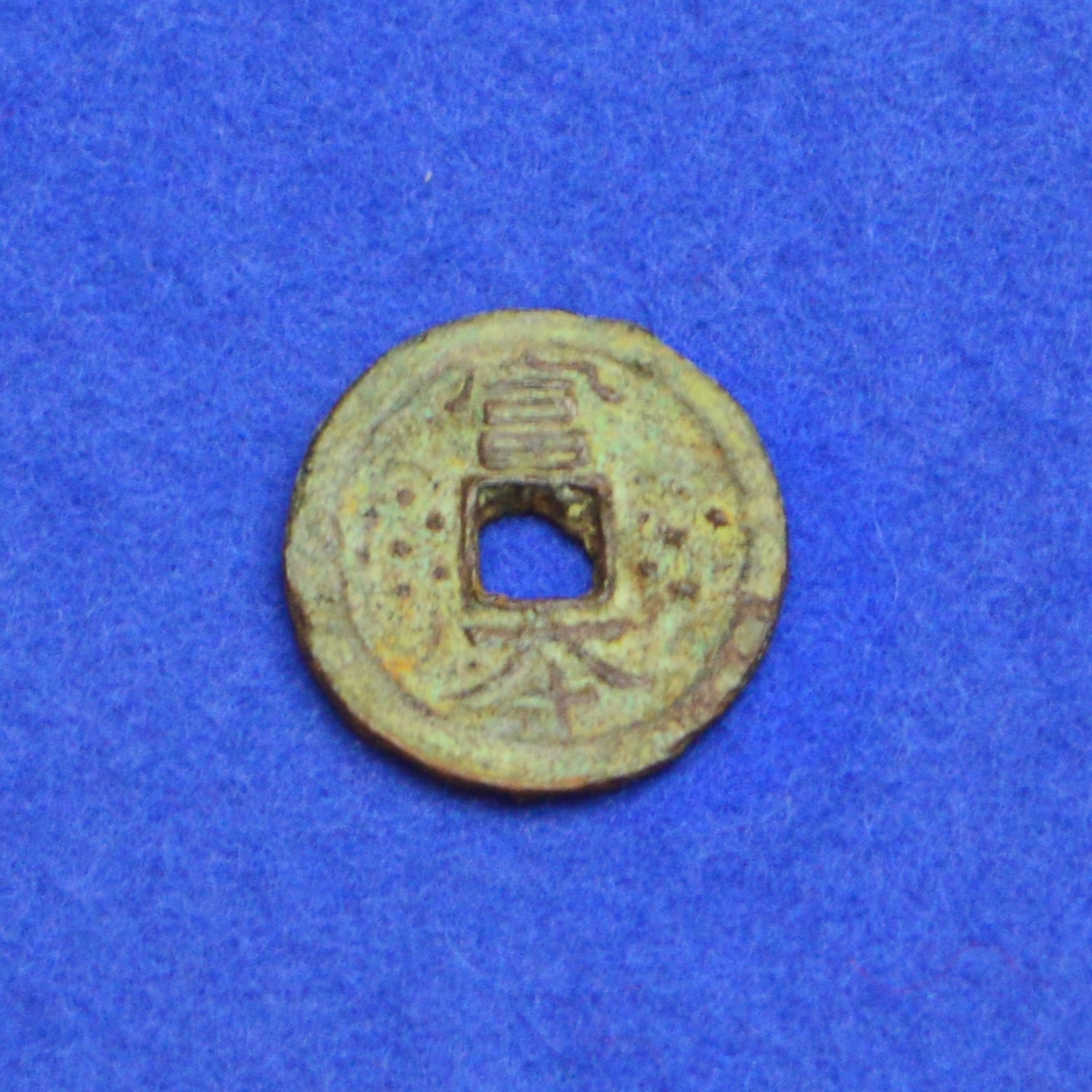
Fuhon on display at the Sakurai City Buried Cultural Properties Center.

The first Japanese mission to China that adopted numerous Chinese cultural practices is recorded to have been sent in 630 AD. As the importance of metallic currency appeared to Japanese nobles, it probably led to some coin minting at the end of the 7th century. It's believed that early Fuhonsen coins made out of silver coins could not have been made any later than 683 AD. This is based on an entry in the Nihon Shoki that states: "Summer, 4th month, 15th day. The Emperor made a decree; saying:-"Henceforth copper coins must be used, and not silver coins". Only copper examples of Fuhonsen have been unearthed so far, which were dated to 687 AD.

Fuhonsen are described as circular with an average diameter of 24.44mm with a square central hole. They are about 1.5 mm thick and weigh between 4.25g to 4.59g. These coins are primarily made of copper, including antimony with traces of silver and bismuth. Using copper as the primary alloy may have been intentional as this would have created a low melting temperature which makes casting easier. Fuhonsen feature a pattern design called "Seven Stars" with the word "Fuyu" written vertically and seven dots arranged in a tortoiseshell shape horizontally. These represent the yin and yang of Wuxing, and are thought to represent the symbols of heaven and earth. The name Fuhon (富本) is made up of two characters: "Tomi" aka "Fu" (富) meaning "wealth", and "Moto" aka "hon" (本) meaning "basis" or "foundation". The inscribed character "本" on the coin is also considered to be an ancient variant of "book" font. This variant has the character written as "tō" or "tou" (夲) which has led some scholars to call these coins "Futōsen" (富夲).

While the first mention of Fuhonsen occurs in the "Wakan Kokonbosen Illustrated Book" (published in 1694 or Genroku 7), a century would pass before the coins were catalogued. This occurred in 1798 (Kansei 10) when lord Kutsuki Masatsuna published examples of the coins with an illustration of Fuhonsen under "Fumoto Seven Star Coins". He also added a footnote stating that Fuhonsen have been known among numismatic researchers for a long time. Kuchiki Masatsuna's collection which included Fuhonsen were sold after his death to the Germans in exchange for 50 Gewehrs at the end of the Edo period. These were needed at the time by the domain due to a financial crisis and the need for Western-style armaments.

== Discovery ==
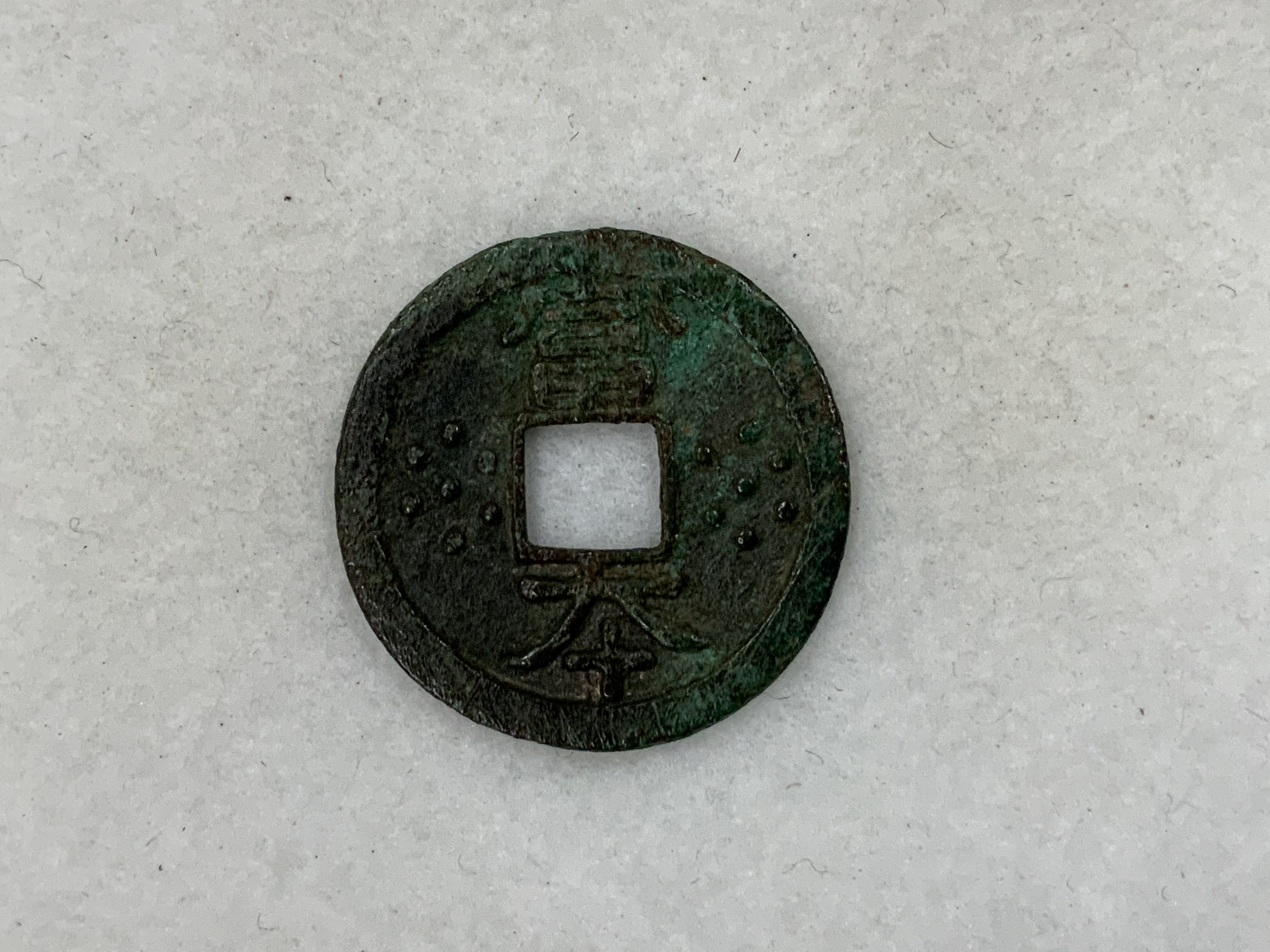
Fuhonsen excavated from Takamori, Nagano.

After Masatsuna's collection was sold, the Fuhonsen was not seen again until the Meiji period when excavated examples were said to have been found in the Shimoina District (Takamori, Nagano) at the Akiba Tower Mound (武陵地古墳群). While these were rumored to exist, more Fuhonsen coins were found in 1997 during an excavation of the Asukaike Kobo Ruins (飛鳥池工房遺跡) in Asuka, Nara. The alleged Meiji period find was later re-investigated and confirmed in 1999 by the Nara National Research Institute for Cultural Properties. During that same year, Kutsuki Masatsuna's collection of Fuhonsen was also discovered to be in the British Museum's collection. It was noted by archaeologists that the coins excavated from Takamori were slightly smaller in diameter and lighter than those excavated from the Asukaike Kobo Ruins.

Nine more coins were later found in a bottle which was excavated in 2008 from the ruins of Fujiwara Palace (藤原宮) in Kashihara, Nara. Almost all of the coins were found to be written in a different style, "Fuyu" (with the "一" character in the "Fu" character omitted). In addition to being thicker than those excavated at the Asukaike ruins, four of the coins were not found to contain antimony which was believed to be a characteristic of Fuhon coins. The most recent reported find occurred in 2012, when a privately owned coin was submitted for appraisal during an episode of TV Tokyo's "Kaiun! Nandemo Kanteidan". It was discovered to have been minted during the same time as the coins excavated from the Fujiwara Palace ruins and was appraised at 5,000,000 yen.

== Usage theories ==
The discovery of Fuhonsen has led to the theory that these coins were Japan's first circulating currency. However, there is still no conclusive evidence to prove this being true. Counter-theories suggest that it's equally possible that the coins could have been used for religious purposes such as Chinese numismatic charms.

Those in favor of circulating currency theories argue that the construction of state-led cities and temples was enormously expensive. Some kind of payment system would have been needed to pay the mobilized population. The Wadōkaichin in particular was issued primarily as a means of payment for the state, while its status as a general medium of exchange was secondary. Other arguments include the possibility that people used Fuhonsen for religious purposes against the intentions of the state. There has been evidence through excavations that show Wadōkaichin was used for more than just circulating currency. Opponents to the Fuhonsen being used as a circulating currency argue that there is no record of an exchange rate that would have been implemented when the new currency (Wadōkaichin) was introduced. Additionally, some documents from the middle of the Nara period describe the first issuance of currency as 708 AD when the Wadōkaichin was introduced.

== See also ==
- Wadōkaichin
- Kaiki Shoho
- Taihei Genpō
- Mannen Tsūhō
- Tokugawa coinage
- List of Japanese cash coins by inscription
