= Kocho Junisen =

12 types of pre-modern Japanese copper coins

kōchō jūnisen (皇朝十二銭) (a.k.a. jūnizeni) is a general term for 12 types of copper coins minted in Japan under the Ritsuryo system from 708 (Wadō 1st year) to 963 (Ōwa 3rd year). All of the included coins are circular in shape, have a square hole in the center, and were worth 1 mon. (Note: "Mon" was a unit of currency (ex: Dollar) before the Muromachi period when they took a physical form.)

== History ==
Japan's first formal currency system was the Kōchōsen (Japanese: 皇朝銭, "Imperial currency"). It was exemplified by the adoption of Japan's first official coin type, the Wadōkaichin. It was first minted in 708 CE on order of Empress Genmei, Japan's 43rd Imperial ruler. "Wadōkaichin" is the reading of the four characters printed on the coin, and is thought to be composed of the era name Wadō (和銅, "Japanese copper"), which could alternatively mean "happiness", and "Kaichin", thought to be related to "Currency".

The Kōchōsen Japanese system of coinage became strongly debased, with its metallic content and value decreasing. By the middle of the 9th century, the value of a coin in rice had fallen to 1/150th of its value of the early 8th century. By the end of the 10th century, compounded with weaknesses in the political system, this led to the abandonment of the national currency, with the return to rice as a currency medium. The last official Japanese coin emission occurred in 958, with very low quality coins called Kengen Taihō (乾元大宝), which soon fell into disuse.

== Coins ==
| Image | Inscription | Kyūjitai | Shinjitai | Year of introduction (Julian calendar) |
|---|---|---|---|---|
| | Wadōkaichin | 和同開珎 | 和同開珎 | 708 |
| | Mannen Tsūhō | 萬年通寳 | 万年通宝 | 760 |
| | Jingū Kaihō | 神功開寳 | 神功開宝 | 765 |
| | Ryūhei Eihō | 隆平永寳 | 隆平永宝 | 796 |
| | Fuju Shinpō | 富壽神寳 | 富寿神宝 | 818 |
| | Jōwa Shōhō | 承和昌寳 | 承和昌宝 | 835 |
| | Chōnen Taihō | 長年大寳 | 長年大宝 | 848 |
| | Jōeki Shinpō | 饒益神寳 | 饒益神宝 | 859 |
| | Jōgan Eihō | 貞觀永寳 | 貞観永宝 | 870 |
| | Kanpyō Taihō | 寛平大寳 | 寛平大宝 | 890 |
| | Engi Tsūhō | 延喜通寳 | 延喜通宝 | 907 |
| | Kengen Taihō | 乹元大寳 | 乾元大宝 | 958 |

== See also ==
- List of Japanese cash coins by inscription
- Taihei Genpō
- Kaiki Shoho
