= Mannen Tsūhō =

Early form of Japanese currency that was issued from 760 to 765 AD

Mannen Tsūhō (万年通宝 aka 萬年通宝) is an early form of Japanese currency that was issued from 760 to 765 AD (Tenpyō-hōji 4 to 9) during the Nara period. These are also known as the second issue of Kocho Junisen under the Ritsuryo system.

== Background ==
The oldest official Japanese coinage is the Wadōkaichin (和同開珎), which is first mentioned in the Shoku Nihongi for August 29, 708. These imitation cash coins were inspired by Chinese Tang dynasty coinage (唐銭) named Kaigen Tsūhō. While Wadōkaichin circulated until 958 AD, twelve different coins were issued in the interim which are now known as Kocho Junisen under the Ritsuryo system. This process began as the Wadōkaichin fell in value due to counterfeit coins and private minting.

== History ==
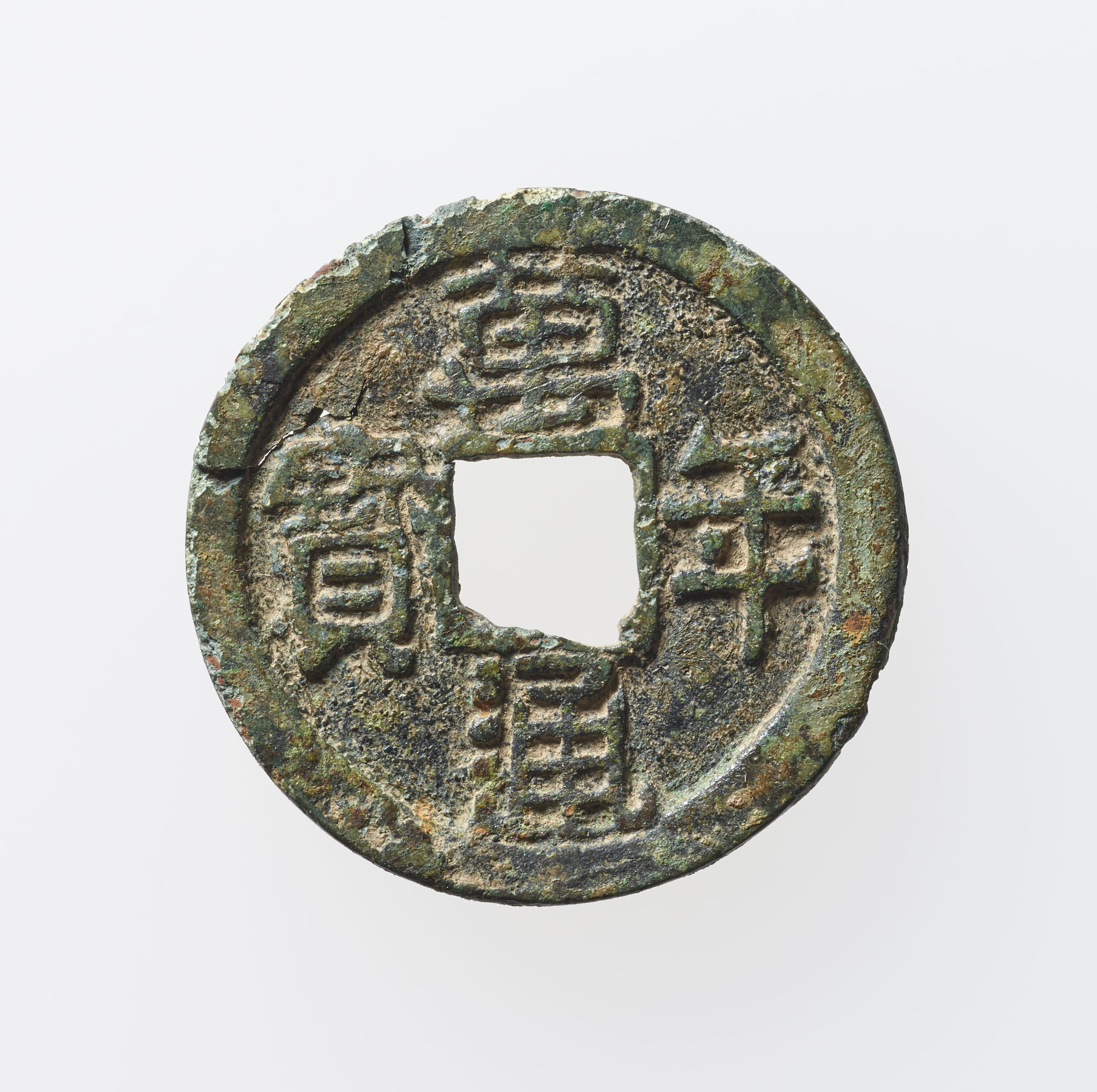
Mannen Tsūhō at the Nara National Museum

According to the Shoku Nihongi, Mannen Tsūhō were issued in 760 (Tenpyō-hōji 4) through an Imperial edict along with the silver Taihei Genpō and the gold Kaiki Shoho. This edict stipulates that 10 Mannen Tsūhō (new copper coins) could be exchanged for 1 silver Taihei Genpo coin, and that 10 silver Taihei Genpō coins were to be used for 1 gold Kaiki Shoho coin.. The right to issue these coins was given to Fujiwara no Nakamaro (Emi no Oshikatsu), who had been appointed Daijō-daijin in the previous year. Mannen Tsūhō were struck in an alloy which contains 77.98% copper, have a weight of 3.75 g and a diameter of 25.5 to 25.8mm. All three of these denominations are said to have characters written by scholar Kibi no Makibi. The characters man (萬), nen (年), tsu (通) ho (宝) written on the obverse roughly translate to: "Current money (or treasure) of Ten Thousand Years".

While in theory the exchange rate was to be implemented, in practice the old Wadōkaichin and new Mannen Tsūhō coins co-circulated. Officials meanwhile, tried in vain to draw attention away from the fact that 10 Wadōkaichin (older copper coins) could be exchanged for 1 new Mannen Tsuho coin. As the Mannen Tsūhō did not circulate at a set value, private coins that imitated these new coins were rampant. Minting eventually ceased after just 5 years of production, making these one of the shortest issued series among (Japanese) ancient coins.

== Excavations ==
Archaeologists have unearthed Mannen Tsūhō coins since at least 1970. According to the Nara National Research Institute for Cultural Properties, "there were 79 mokkan, plus coins including Wado kaichin and Mannen tsuho examples" recovered from a ditch at the ruins of Akita Castle. Another undated excavation at the Sakata-dera site unearthed 291 copper coins which included Wadōkaichin, Mannen-tsuho, Jingu-kaiho, and Kaigen-tsuho coins from the Tang dynasty. Mannen Tsūhō have since become available to collectors as authenticated examples sell online.

== See also ==
- Mumonginsen
- Fuhonsen
- List of Japanese cash coins by inscription
