= Asuka Pond Workshop Site =

Archaeological site in Asuka, Nara, Japan

Coordinates: 34°28′41.2″N 135°49′20.1″E

- 飛鳥池工房遺跡 (Japanese)
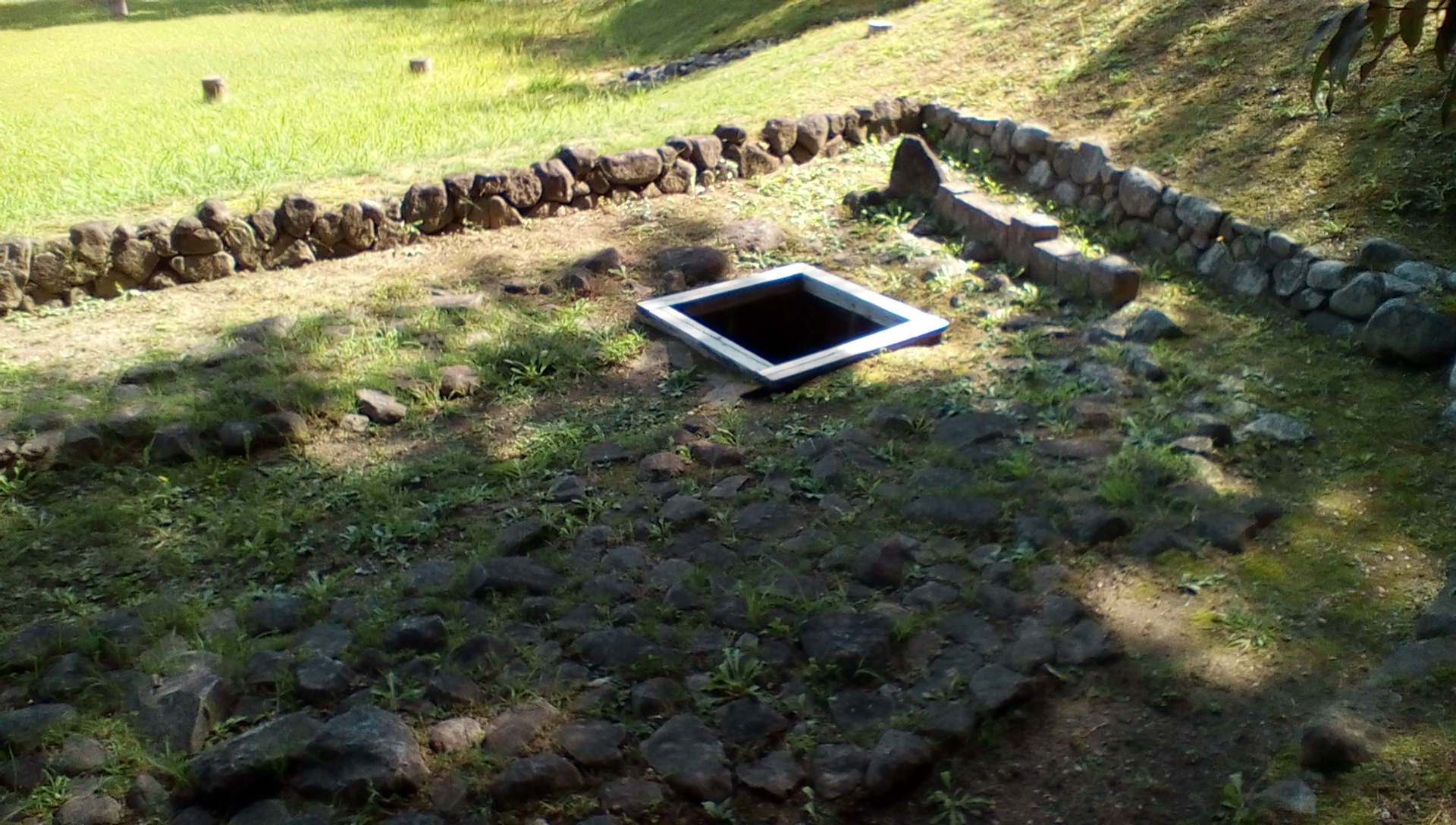
- Asuka Pond Workshop Site

- Asuka Pond Workshop Site Asuka Pond Workshop Site (Japan)
- Periods: Asuka period
- Location: Asuka, Nara, Japan
- Region: Kansai region

History
- Built: c.7th century

Site notes
- Public access: Yes
- National Historic Site of Japan

Asuka Pond Workshop Site (飛鳥池工房遺跡, Asuka-ike kōbō iseki) is an archaeological site with the remains of an Asuka period industrial complex, located in the village of Asuka, Nara in the Kansai region of Japan. Its ruins were designated a National Historic Site of Japan in 2001.

== Overview ==
The Asukaike Kōbō Ruins are located in a valley in the hills of Asuka, located at the southern end of the Nara Basin. It was discovered in 1991 after reclamation work drained the Edo period Asukaike Pond, revealing ruins which had been concealed under its waters. Archaeological excavations conducted since 1997 found that the ruins stretched over 230 meters from north-to-south along the valley, with the remains of a facility believed to be a workshop on the south side and a related government office on the north side. From the remains of the workshops on the south side, each workshop was found to have been arranged by industry, such as metal processing of gold, silver, copper, iron, etc., processing of beads such as glass, crystal, and amber, and lacquerware, tiles, and tortoiseshell work. This is one of the largest known industrial sites in Japan at the time, with more than 300 furnaces in total. Furthermore, the wooden tablets excavated confirmed that the site dates from the reign of Emperor Tenmu and Empress Jitō (late 7th century) to the 8th century. Of particular note were 560 unfinished Fuhonsen coins, as well as coin-casting related items such as molds and cast poles, confirming that coins were being minted before the Wadōkaichin previously thought to have been the oldest Japanese coins. The southern area was separated from the northern area by a wall constructed in almost the center of the valley. The northern area had a tone-paved well, a square stone pond, a water channel, and a building in the style of a government office. A large number of wooden tablets and 33 Fuhonsen coins were found in this area as well. Based on the nature of the remains and artifacts, this area is considered to have been the location of facilities for managing workshops.

As it is located just southeast of the Asuka-dera temple grounds and located northeast of Asuka Kiyomihara Palace, there are two theories: one that it was a workshop attached to Asuka-dera, and the other that it was a workshop related to the state or the Imperial family at the time, possibly a precursor of "Takumi-ryō" (Ministry of Crafts) under the Ritsuryō system of the Nara period.

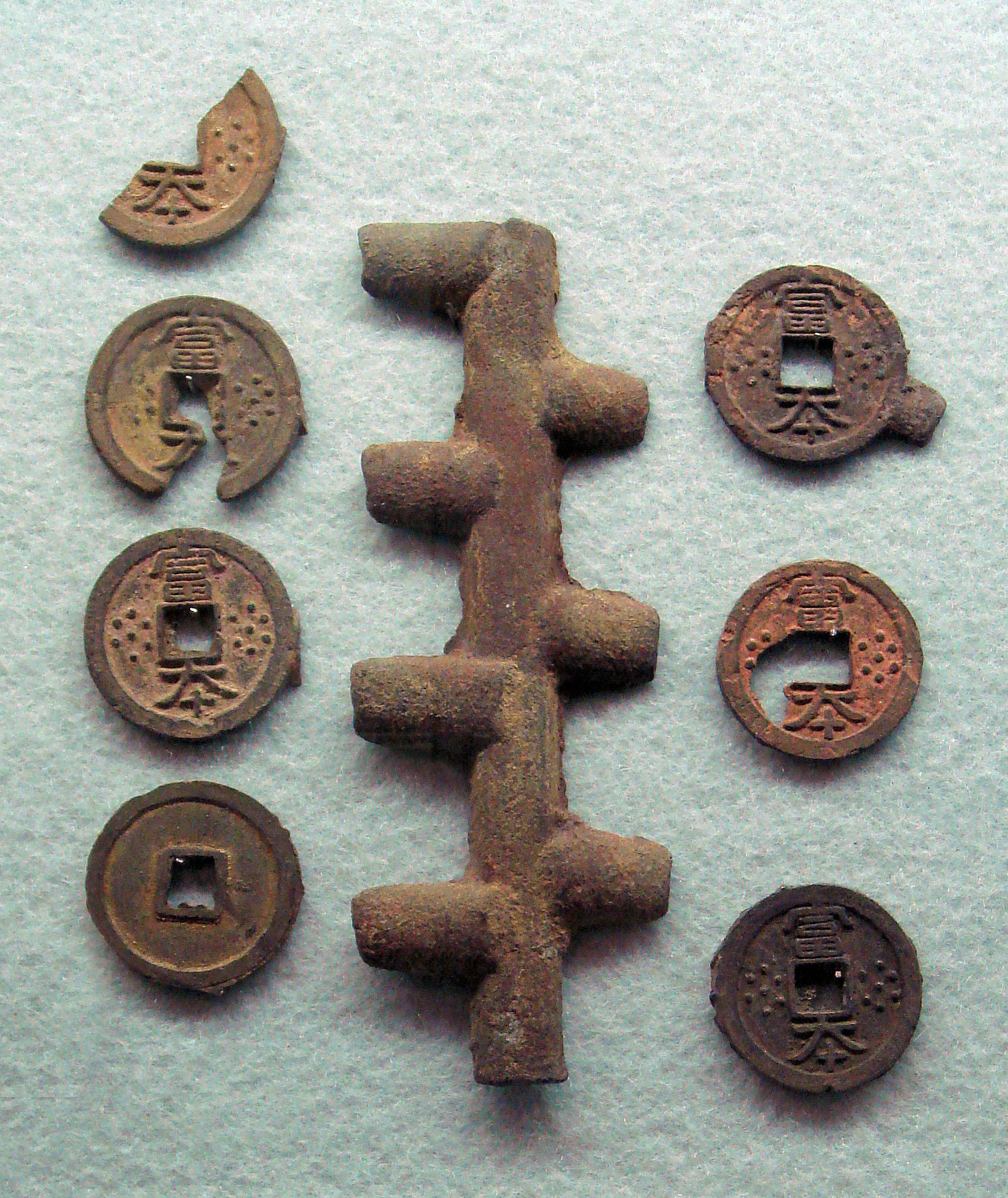
Fuhonsen found at the Asukaike site

== See also ==
- List of Historic Sites of Japan (Nara)
