= List of Japanese cash coins by inscription =

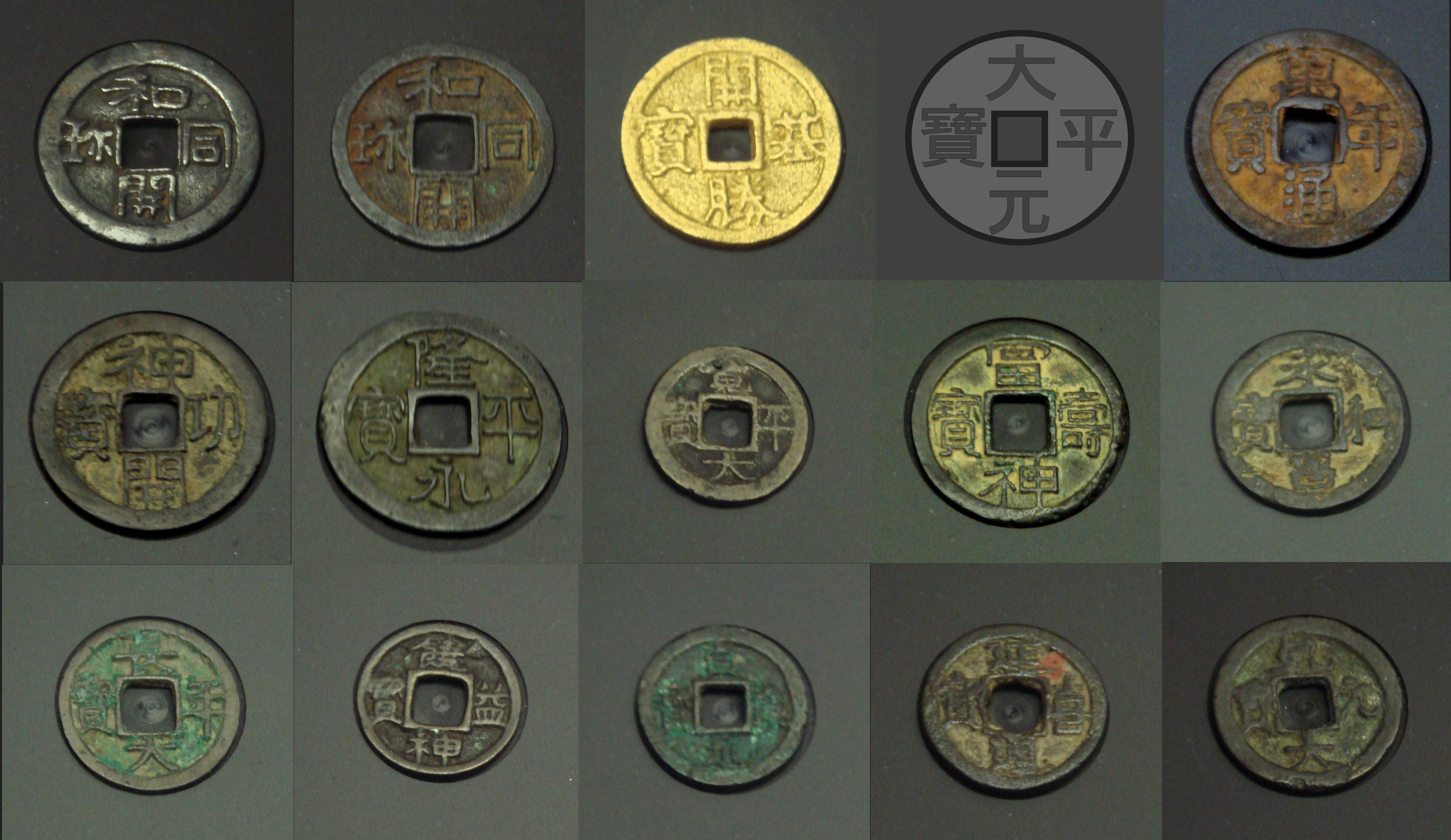
Known cash coin types of Japan produced from 708 to 958, chronologically arranged.

Cash coins were introduced to Japan in the century inspired by the Chinese Kaigen Tsūhō (開元通寳) cash coins from the Tang dynasty. Chinese cash coins also circulated in other countries and inspired similar currencies such as the Korean mun, Ryukyuan mon, Vietnamese văn, while they also circulated as far south as Indonesia. Because these currencies were so similar cash coins around the Far East were interchangeable and Japanese cash coins circulated in other countries while foreign cash coins also circulated in Japan.

The first Japanese cash coins were the Wadōkaichin (和同開珎) which were produced from 29 August 708. In 760 Japanese currency was reformed and gold and silver cash coins were introduced, however by the end of the 10th century the value of Japanese coinage had severely fallen combined with a weak central government led the Japanese to return to barter. From the 12th century onwards the Japanese started importing Chinese currency again even while the Southern Song dynasty banned the export of its coinage, while the import of Chinese cash coins surged again during the Ming dynasty era when large amounts of Ming Chinese cash coins were imported.

The Japanese started locally imitating Chinese cash coins, which were known as Shichūsen (私鋳銭). But the quality of these cash coins varied severely depending on the mint. As many cash coins circulated in the market for a long time their quality diminished over time becoming known as Bitasen (鐚銭, "bad metal money"). After the Tokugawa shogunate banned Bitasen in 1608 they started producing their own coinage and after 1859 provincial authorities were allowed to mint their own coinages. Japanese cash coins were officially demonetised in 1891 after officially circulating as a division of the Japanese yen with an exchange rate of 10.000 mon for 1 yen.

== Kōchōsen ==
Inscription	Kyūjitai	Shinjitai	Year of introduction (Julian calendar)	Image
Wadōkaichin	和同開珎	和同開珎	708	
Mannen Tsūhō	萬年通寳	万年通宝	760	
Taihei Genpō	大平元寶	大平元宝	760 (Note: These coins are not mentioned with Kocho Junisen as there is no given evidence of circulation. They could have been used instead as show money or presentation pieces to set the common value of copper coins.)	None known
Kaiki Shoho	開基勝寶	開基勝宝	760	
Jingū Kaihō	神功開寳	神功開宝	765	
Ryūhei Eihō	隆平永寳	隆平永宝	796	
Fuju Shinpō	富壽神寳	富寿神宝	818	
Jōwa Shōhō	承和昌寳	承和昌宝	835	
Chōnen Taihō	長年大寳	長年大宝	848	
Jōeki Shinpō	饒益神寳	饒益神宝	859	
Jōgan Eihō	貞觀永寳	貞観永宝	870	
Kanpyō Taihō	寛平大寳	寛平大宝	890	
Engi Tsūhō	延喜通寳	延喜通宝	907	
Kengen Taihō	乹元大寳	乾元大宝	958	

== Toraisen, Shichūsen, and Bitasen ==
List of Toraisen, Shichūsen, and Bitasen cash coins:

Inscription	Kyūjitai	Shinjitai	Image
Kōbu Tsūhō	洪武通寶	洪武通宝	
Eiraku Tsūhō	永樂通寳	永楽通宝	
Katei Tsūhō	嘉靖通寶	嘉靖通宝	
Shōfu Tsūhō	祥符通寶	祥符通宝	
Heian Tsūhō	平安通寶	平安通宝	
Genyū Tsūhō	元祐通寶	元祐通宝	

List of Bitasen cash coins (Katou bitasen (加刀鐚銭)) that originated in China (these were recut from circulating Chinese coinage).

Inscription	Kyūjitai	Shinjitai	Image
Junpei Genpō	順平元寳	順平元宝	
Genpō Tsūhō	元豊通寶	元豊通宝	
Genfu Tsūhō	元符通寶	元符通宝	
Shidō Genpō	至道元寳	至道元宝	

== Edo period ==
=== List of cash coins issued by the Tokugawa shogunate ===
During the history of the Japanese mon under the Tokugawa shogunate, many different cash coins with different obverse inscriptions were cast, the main cash coins cast by the central government were:

Inscription	Kyūjitai	Shinjitai	Year of introduction (Gregorian calendar)	Nengō (Japanese calendar)	Denomination(s)	Image
Keichō Tsūhō	慶長通寳	慶長通宝	1606	Keichō 11	1 mon	
Genna Tsūhō	元和通寳	元和通宝	1616	Genna 2	1 mon	
Kan'ei Tsūhō	寛永通寳	寛永通宝	1626 (1 mon) (Note: The Kan'ei Tsūhō was first minted in 1626 (Kan'ei 5) in the Mito domain on a small scale, but the Tokugawa government started mass producing the coin in 1636 (Kan'ei 15).); 1768 (4 mon)	Kan'ei 5 (1 mon); Meiwa 5 (4 mon)	1 mon 4 mon	
Hōei Tsūhō	寳永通寳	宝永通宝	1708	Hōei 5	10 mon	
Tenpō Tsūhō	天保通寳	天保通宝	1835	Tenpō 6	100 mon	
Bunkyū Ēhō	文久永寳	文久永宝	1863	Bunkyū 3	4 mon	

=== List of Nagasaki trade coins ===
The following coins were minted in the city of Nagasaki for export to other countries:

Inscription (Kyūjitai)	Inscription (Shinjitai)	Font	Japanese (Romaji)	Mandarin (Hànyǔ Pīnyīn)	Vietnamese (chữ Quốc ngữ)	Image (Note: Click to enlarge)
元豊通寳	元豊通宝	Clerical script, Semi-cursive script, Seal script	Genpō Tsūhō	Yuán Fēng Tōng Bǎo	Nguyên Phong Thông Bảo	Nagasaki-genpotsuho-reisho
天聖元寳	天聖元宝	Regular script	Tensei Genpō	Tiān Shèng Yuán Bǎo	Thiên Thánh Nguyên Bảo	Nagasaki-tenseigenpo-reisho
祥符元寳	祥符元宝	Regular script	Shofu Genpō	Xiáng Fú Yuán Bǎo	Tường Phù Nguyên Bảo	Nagasaki-shohugenpo-reisho
嘉祐通寳	嘉祐通宝	Regular script	Kayū Tsūhō	Jiā Yòu Tōng Bǎo	Gia Hựu Thông Bảo	Nagasaki-kayutsuho-reisho
熈寧元寳	煕寧元宝	Regular script, Seal script	Kinei Genpō	Xī Níng Yuán Bǎo	Hi Ninh Nguyên Bảo	Nagasaki-kineigenpo-tensho
紹聖元寳	紹聖元宝	Seal script	Shōsei Genpō	Shào Shèng Yuán Bǎo	Thiệu Thánh Nguyên Bảo	Nagasaki-shoseigenpo-tensho
治平元寳	治平元宝	Seal script	Jihei Genpō	Zhì Píng Yuán Bǎo	Trị Bình Nguyên Bảo	

Nagasaki trade coins notably bear the inscription of many Song dynasty coins because those coins were already widespread in circulation on the Southeast Asian market making the Nagasaki trade coins more familiar for its target demographic.

=== List of local cash coins cast during the Bakumatsu ===
Many Japanese domains produced their own currency which happened chaotically, so that the nation's money supply expanded by 2.5 times between 1859 and 1869, leading to crumbling money values and soaring prices.

These coins were often produced with the name of the domain or province on them, the mon coins produced by domains are:

Inscription	Kyūjitai	Shinjitai	Domain	Image
Sendai Tsūhō	仙臺通寳	仙台通宝	Sendai	
Hosokura tō hyaku	細倉當百	細倉当百	Sendai	
Isawa Tsūhō	膽澤通寳	胆沢通宝	Sendai	
Tetsuzan Tsūhō	鐵山通寳	鉄山通宝	Morioka	
Hakodate Tsūhō	箱館通寳	箱館通宝	Matsumae	
Dōzan Tsūhō	銅山通寳	銅山通宝	Kubota	
Ashū Tsūhō	阿州通寳	阿州通宝	Tokushima	
Tosa Tsūhō	土佐通寳	土佐通宝	Tosa	
Chikuzen Tsūhō (100 mon)	筑前通寳 - 當百	筑前通宝 - 当百	Fukuoka	
Ryūkyū Tsūhō (100 mon)	琉球通寳 - 當百	琉球通宝 - 当百	Satsuma	
Ryūkyū Tsūhō (½ Shu)	琉球通寳 - 半朱	琉球通宝 - 半朱	Satsuma	

== See also ==
- List of Chinese cash coins by inscription

== Sources ==
- Early Japanese Coins. David Hartill. ISBN 978-0-7552-1365-8, Published: October 6, 2011.
