= Taihei Genpō =

Early Japanese currency

Taihei Genpō (大平元宝; a.k.a. 大平󠄁元寶) is an early form of Japanese silver currency which is recorded in the Shoku Nihongi of the Nara period. Historical documents confirm that this coinage was established in the 4th year of Tenpyō-hōji, along with copper Mannen Tsuho and gold Kaiki Shoho coins. While their history is confirmed, no actual genuine coins have ever been found.

== Overview ==
The Imperial edict for Taihei Genpō coins appears in the Shoku Nihongi where it is entered for March 16 in the 4th year of Tenpyo Hoji (760) during the reign of Emperor Junnin. This edict stipulates that 10 silver Taihei Genpo coins were to be used for 1 gold Kaiki Shoho coin. 1 silver Taihei Genpo coin could also be exchanged for 10 Mannen Tsuho (new copper coins). The right to issue these coins was given to Fujiwara no Nakamaro (Emi no Oshikatsu), who had been appointed Daijō-daijin the previous year. As with Mannen Tsuho and Kaiki Shoho coins, Taihei Genpō are presumed to have been round with square-holes.

== Existence ==
Although there are no reported cases of anyone finding a genuine Taihei Genpo coin, claims of a find do exist. During the Taisho period in 1928, two coins which were declared to be Taihei Genpo were discovered in a "treasure room" at Toshodaiji Temple. However, this is open for interpretation as only rubbings remain of the actual coins which have since gone missing. The rubbings themselves are written differently when it comes to the word "Taihei" (太平元寳) as opposed to "Taihei" (大平元寳). On the other hand, "Taihei" is an auspicious word that means peace throughout the world. It's said at the time that there was a wish for Emperor Junnin's reign to be peaceful.

Other claims since the Taisho-era find involve a photo from a 2004 document of a Taihei Genpō coin that was allegedly found in 1735 (the photo was taken long after the find). This story is said to have involved a mounter from Osaka who removed a scroll to repair a large Buddhist painting entrusted to him by a noble family. When two small silver coins dropped out, he presented them to the head of the family who praised him for his honesty and was given one as a gift. The coin weighed 1.48 momme (5.55 grams), about half the weight of the gold Kaiki Shoho coin. When the photo of the coin was examined by the Kurokawa Institute of Ancient Cultures, it was found that the style of the written characters meant that it couldn't have been made in the 8th century.

== Assessment ==
Given a lack of physical evidence, it's assumed that Taihei Genpō coins were not in general circulation at the time. One possible explanation involves the "very favorable" exchange rate where 1 newly issued silver coin (Taihei Genpo) was worth 10 new copper coins (Mannen Tsuho). In this theory, silver Taihei Genpō and gold Kaiki Shoho coins were merely show money to set a high value for imperial copper coins. An effort was made to draw attention away from the fact that 10 Wadōkaichin (older copper coins) could be exchanged for 1 new Mannen Tsuho coin. If this exchange rate was actually carried out as ordered, then there would have been a rush of people wanting to exchange Mannen Tsuho for Taihei Genho. This in turn would have quickly depleted the government's supply of silver Taihei Genho coins which would have disrupted the circulation of Mannen Tsuho. Since the value of Taihei Genpō was also equal to 100 Wadokaichin coins, it was inevitable that privately minted coins would appear. As a result the government didn't want to put Taihei Genho coins into circulation as it would have caused confusion in the monetary economy.

Japanese legal historian Mitsuo Tokumitsu has suggested that the coins could have also been destroyed when Emperor Junnin was dethroned. Those who agree with this theory include director Satoru Yoshizawa of the Collection Department at the Nara National Museum. Yoshizawa suggests that the coins were retrieved and recast into a pair of silver vases which are now at Shōsōin (treasure house).

== See also ==
- List of Japanese cash coins by inscription
