= Kaiki Shoho =

Early Japanese currency

Kaiki Shōhō (開基勝宝) is an early form of Japanese currency that was issued in 760 (Tenpyō-hōji 4) during the Nara period. These coins were struck in a gold alloy, and have a circular square hole in the middle. Very few "Kaiki Shoho" coins were minted as they were possibly an early experiment. This is not a collectible type of coinage as the only 32 surviving coins are held by the Japanese government.

== History ==
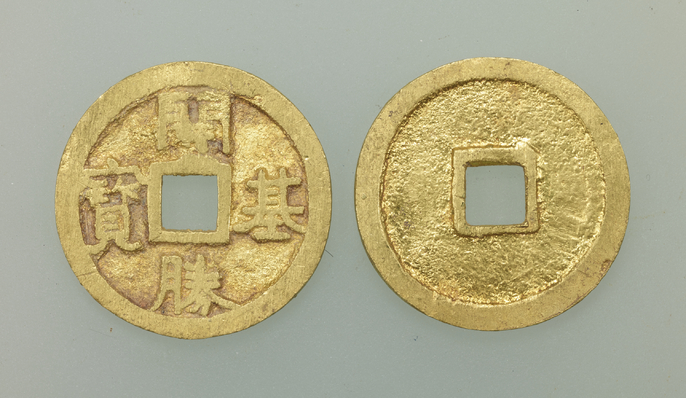
An example of "Kaiki Shoho" in the Tokyo National Museum

"Kaiki Shoho" coins were issued in the fourth year of Tenpyō-hōji (760) during the reign of Emperor Junnin along with silver Taihei Genpō, and bronze Mannen Tsūhō coins. All three of these denominations are said to have characters written by scholar Kibi no Makibi. "Kaiki Shoho" in particular were minted on the order of Daijō-daijin Fujiwara no Nakamaro, who was leading the government at the time. They were fixed in value and had an exchange ratio of 1 gold Kaiki Shoho coin for 10 silver Taihei Genpō or 100 bronze Mannen Tsūhō coins.

Based on historical sources and archaeological evidence, Kaiki Shoho were probably not widely distributed. These is no given evidence that Kaiki Shoho actually circulated as currency, and the coins may have acted as "show money". Anthropologist Neil Gordon Munro remarked that Kaiki Shoho was intended to be the "pioneer of a gold currency". He concluded however, that the country was too poor at the time to "warrant such an experiment being carried out on a large scale."

These coins were eventually lost to history until 1794 (Kansei 6) when one piece was excavated from the ruins of Saidai-ji. It was then kept at Saidai-ji as a treasure until 1876 (Meiji 6) when it was offered to the emperor as he visited. As the coin passed into the Imperial family it eventually became a national treasure. It was noted in 1903 by "The Japan Weekly Mail" that this unique coin "left only a host of conjectures" on its origin. In 1937 (Showa 12) when 31 more coins were discovered by chance during land clearing for a residential area. All 32 coins are now kept as cultural artifacts which are managed by the Japanese government.

== See also ==
- List of Japanese cash coins by inscription
