= Kaiyuan Tongbao =

Historical Chinese currency

Kaiyuan Tongbao (開元通寳)
- Tang dynasty (China) (Note: Kaiyuan Tongbao coins were also produced in Sogdia.)
- Value: 1 wén
- Composition: Bronze, (Note: The majority of Kaiyuan Tongbao coins were made from bronze.) lead, "white bronze", iron, (Note: Iron Kaiyuan Tongbao cash coins were predominantly cast in Sichuan where there had been a shortage of copper. There is evidence that iron Kaiyuan Tongbao coins also circulated in Hebei under the Tang dynasty.) silver, or gold
- Years of minting: 621–907

Obverse
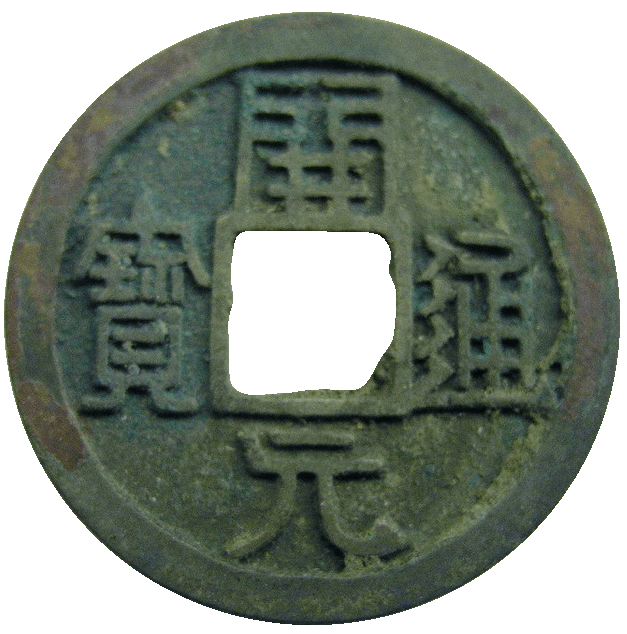
- Design: Kaiyuan Tongbao (開元通寳)
- Designer: Ouyang Xun (歐陽詢)

Reverse
- Design: Usually blank, sometimes with nail marks, crescents, dots, or clouds, while "Huichang Kaiyuan Tongbao" cash coins tend to have mint marks (see below).

The Kaiyuan Tongbao (traditional Chinese: 開元通寶; simplified Chinese: 开元通宝; pinyin: kāiyuán tōng bǎo; lit. 'Circulating treasure from the inauguration of a new epoch'), sometimes romanised as Kai Yuan Tong Bao or using the archaic Wade-Giles spelling K'ai Yuan T'ung Pao, was a Tang dynasty cash coin that was produced from 621 under the reign of Emperor Gaozu and remained in production for most of the Tang dynasty until 907. The Kaiyuan Tongbao was notably the first cash coin to use the inscription tōng bǎo (通寶) and an era title as opposed to have an inscription based on the weight of the coin as was the case with Ban Liang, Wu Zhu and many other earlier types of Chinese cash coins. The Kaiyuan Tongbao's calligraphy and inscription inspired subsequent Central Asian, Japanese, Korean, Ryūkyūan, and Vietnamese cash coins and became the standard until the last cash coin to use the inscription "通寶" was cast until the early 1940s in French Indochina.

The Kaiyuan Tongbao also signified a major change in how money circulated in the Chinese Empire, while previously cash coins were valued based on their weights, they would now be valued based on government regulations.

After the fall of the Tang dynasty Kaiyuan Tongbao coins would continue to be produced by various states of the Five Dynasties and Ten Kingdoms period.

During the Ming dynasty, and later dynasties, the Kaiyuan Tongbao would become the most important cash coin to be used in traditional Chinese medicine.

== Manufacture ==
=== Wax mother coins ===
Under the Sui and Tang dynasties mother coins reached their definite form and were produced in moulds engraved by ancestor coins, however during this same period a casting technique called "the lost wax method" was used to cast the Kaiyuan Tongbao cash coins, in this method mother coins made from wax rather than metal were used, these mother coins were produced in large quantities because they were very cheap to make, unlike metal mother coins these wax mother coins stayed in the clay moulds and when the mould heated up they would melt away leaving a cavity for the molten metal to pour into forming the coins. This technique was also used for casting other bronze items however it was only used for casting coinage during the Sui and Tang dynasties and its sudden discontinuation pointed out to the fact that it was probably inefficient for mass-producing small items such as coins.

=== Clay moulds ===
Various moulds were used in coin casting. See the Chinese Wikipedia page on 錢範.

The world's only known authentic specimen of a Tang dynasty period clay mould (traditional Chinese: 錢陶範; simplified Chinese: 钱陶范; pinyin: Qián táo fàn) that was used to cast Kaiyuan Tongbao cash coins was unearthed in Shutang, Wangcheng District, Changsha, Hunan on August 17, 1992, by Mr. Ceng Jingyi (traditional Chinese: 曾敬儀; simplified Chinese: 曾敬仪; pinyin: Céng Jìngyí), a retired teacher and coin collector. The Kaiyuan Tongbao clay mould is classified as a Chinese "national treasure" (traditional Chinese: 國寶級; simplified Chinese: 国宝级; pinyin: Guóbǎo jí).

Up until the unearthing of this clay mould in the year 1992, no moulds were known to exist for the casting of Tang dynasty coinage. The discovery of this clay mould has made it unclear as to what process was actually used to cast the Kaiyuan Tongbao cash coins.

While the Kaiyuan Tongbao cash coins could have been cast in the traditional manner from moulds made of clay, stone, or bronze as was the case since the Warring States period, it was believed that cash coins during this period were being cast in sand using "mother coins" (母錢) to make the impressions where the circulation cash coins would later be produced from. With the discovery of this unique clay mould, however, it has now been confirmed that clay moulds were still being used by mints to cast cash coins during the Tang dynasty period.

The unique Kaiyuan Tongbao clay mould was placed on display at the "Exhibition of Chinese Ancient Coins" (traditional Chinese: 中國歷代錢幣展; simplified Chinese: 中国历代钱币展; pinyin: Zhōngguó lìdài qiánbì zhǎn) which was held at the Ouyang Xun Cultural Park (traditional Chinese: 歐陽詢文化園; simplified Chinese: 欧阳询文化园; pinyin: Ōuyáng xún wénhuà yuán) located in Shutang (traditional Chinese: 書堂; simplified Chinese: 书堂; pinyin: Shū táng).

== History ==
Under the Tang dynasty the earlier Wu Zhu coins of the Sui dynasty would remain the standard currency, but during the fourth year of the Wu De (武德) period (or 621 of the Gregorian calendar) Emperor Gaozu decreed that the Kaiyuan Tongbao coin be cast with a strictly enforced standard weight of 1/10 Liǎng (兩). The introduction of this new series of cash coins proved to be of epochal significance in the monetary history of China as the new coin started the "Baowen coinage" system (together with the Ban Liang cash coins introduced during the Qin period and Wu Zhu cash coins introduced during the Han period, making them the three major coinage systems in monetary history of China), which influenced the Chinese coinage system for over a millennium. The Kaiyuan Tongbao also changed the way that cash coins were valued, as before they were dependent on their weight but starting from the Kaiyuan Tongbao the value of a cash coin would be determined by government regulation. The government of the Tang dynasty initially set up the Money Casting Bureau, which operated mints in a total of 14 locations.

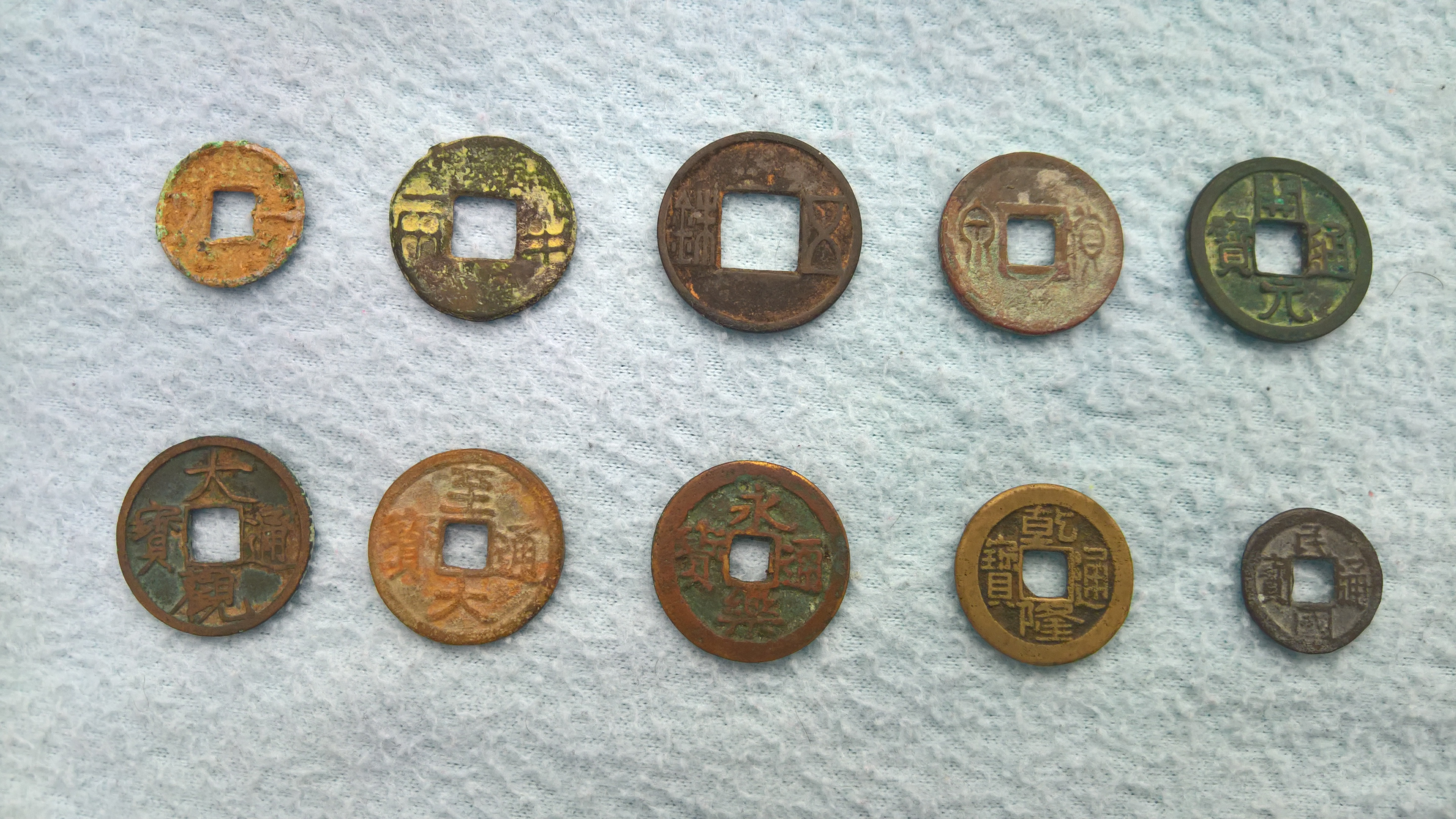
The Kaiyuan Tongbao set the standard for the next thousand years of cast Chinese coinages until the early Republic of China.

Unlike earlier Chinese cash coins which had their legends based on their weight, the Kaiyuan Tongbao was notably the first Chinese cash coin to use the tōng bǎo (通寶) inscription and simultaneously inspired the yuán bǎo (元寶) inscription. The reason that the Kaiyuan Tongbao also inspired the yuán bǎo legend is because the Chinese people themselves had trouble figuring out the correct character order, as the inscription is read in what was referred to as the "standard order" (top-bottom-right-left) some people accidentally read it in the wrong order as they had assumed that the inscription was read clockwise as Kaitong Yuanbao (開通元寶), this was also because rather than having the first two characters spell out the period title (which was Wu De when the Kaiyuan Tongbao was introduced), they had a different inscription. However this mistake in how the legend was read inspired the Northwest Chinese rebel Shi Siming to cast his own cash coins with the inscription Shuntian Yuanbao (順天元寶, shùn tiān yuán bǎo) cash coins first issued in Luoyang in 759, this coin however does have a clockwise inscription. Another term that was used to denote "the currency type" in Chinese coin inscriptions was zhòng bǎo (重寶) which could be translated as "heavy currency". The first cash coin to have this inscription was the Qianyuan Zhongbao (乾元重寶) which was first produced in the year 759. The terms yuán bǎo (元寶) and zhòng bǎo (重寶) which were both established during a 138-year period of the Tang dynasty would continue to be used on Chinese coins to the very end of the Qing dynasty in 1911. While the term tōng bǎo (通寶) was even used longer with the last Chinese cash coin, the Minguo Tongbao (民國通寶) being produced in Dongchuan, Yunnan during the early Republic of China period.

Another important difference with the inscription of the Kaiyuan Tongbao compared to earlier Chinese cash coins was that it was not written in seal script but rather in the more plain calligraphic clerical script. The Emperor asked one of China's most well-known calligraphers, Ouyang Xun to write down the legend of the cash coin. This was also the first time in Chinese history that a famous calligrapher wrote the characters for a Chinese cash coin. Minting and copper extraction were centrally controlled, and private casting was punishable by death. For the first time we find regulations giving the prescribed coinage alloy: 83% copper, 15% lead, and 2% tin. Previously the percentages used seem to have been on an ad hoc basis. Actual analyses show rather less copper than this.

The standard weight of the Kaiyuan Tongbao was 1 mace, but a notable thing about the cash coins of the Tang dynasty is, that for the first and only time in the monetary history of China, the coins grew bigger and heavier during the reign of the dynasty.

The New Book of Tang states that the imperial government specified the alloy ratio for Kaiyuan Tongbao cash coins upon their introduction at 21,200 jin of copper, 3700 jin of pewter, and 500 jin of black tin (equivalent to 83% Cu and 17% Pb + Sn) per mint. At first, mints were set up in Luoyang in Henan, and also in Peking, Chengdu, Bingzhou (Taiyuan in Shanxi), and then Guilin in Guangxi. Minting rights were also granted to some princes and officials. By 660, deterioration of the coinage due to forgery had become a problem. The regulations were reaffirmed in 718, and forgeries suppressed. In 737, the first commissioner with overall responsibility for casting was appointed. 1 furnace that produced 3.3 million Kaiyuan Tongbao coins a year during the Tian Bao period between 713 and 756 would need 21220 jin of copper, 3709 jin of tin, and 540 jin per regulation of lead and had an average waste of 23,5 %. The Kaiyuan Tongbao cash coins produced during the Tian Bao period had an officially set copper alloy however some Kaiyuan coins from this period were blue or white it's likely that other alloys were also used. In 739, ten mints were recorded, with a total of 89 furnaces casting some 327,000 strings of cash a year. 123 liang of metal were needed to produce a string of coins weighing 100 liang. In the late 740s, skilled artisans were employed for casting, rather than conscripted peasants. Despite these measures, the coinage continued to deteriorate. In 808, a ban on hoarding coins was proclaimed. This was repeated in 817. Regardless of the rank of a person, they could not hold more than 5,000 strings of cash. Cash balances exceeding this amount had to be expended within two months to purchase goods. This was an attempt to compensate for the lack of cash in circulation. By 834, mint output had fallen to 100,000 strings a year, mainly due to the shortage of copper. Forgeries using lead and tin alloys were produced.

Due to the fact that this continued to be produced for two centuries by various mints all over China there are several hundred varieties of the Kaiyuan Tongbao that can be distinguished from each other due to slight differences.

The Kaiyuan Tongbao cash coins that were first cast until the height of the Tang period, early issues can be very accurately assigned to their time of casting and archeological evidence from Tang era tombs indeed prove that the first stroke of the character "元" are shorter than later versions, for this reason these coins are referred to as "short one yuan" (短一元, duǎn yī yuán) versions. A lesser quantity of these early Kaiyuan Tongbao cash coins are made from what the Chinese call "white copper" (白銅, bái tóng) and are subsequently referred to as "White Copper/Baitong Kaiyuan Tongbao coins" (白銅開元通寶, báitóng kāiyuán tōng bǎo) today, however during the Tang dynasty itself they were given the nickname "pure coins" (青錢, qīng qián) which also became the basis for the nickname (外號) of "pure coin scholar" (青錢學士, qīng qián xué shì) which was given to Emperor Gaozong as his writings were said to resemble the coins.

There also exist Kaiyuan Tongbao cash coins which are differentiated by their second horizontal stroke, other than the first variant these others quite rare. The following versions of the Kaiyuan Tongbao coin can be distinguished by the "元" character's second horizontal stroke (or "shoulder"): (Note: Excavations during the 1950s at a Buddhist pagoda on Niushou Hill in Jiangning indicated that there might be evidence that the Right Shoulder Kaiyuan Tongbao and Two Shoulders Kaiyuan Tongbao variants might have been cast around Nanjing.)

English (nick)name	Traditional Chinese	Simplified Chinese	Differentiating characteristic	Image
Left shoulder Kaiyuan Tongbao	左挑開元通寶	左挑開元通宝	The left "shoulder" slants upwards.	
Right shoulder Kaiyuan Tongbao	右挑開元通寶	右挑開元通宝	The right "shoulder" slants upwards.	
Two shoulders Kaiyuan Tongbao	雙挑開元通寶	双挑開元通宝	Both "shoulders" slant upwards.	
No shoulder Kaiyuan Tongbao	不挑開元通寶	不挑開元通宝	neither "shoulder" slants upwards.	

Kaiyuan Tongbao cash coins also commonly have differentiating features on their reverse, these can include crescents which according to legend happened when either Empress Zhangsun or Empress Taimu or in some versions of the story Yang Guifei pressed her fingernail into a specimen Kaiyuan Tongbao coin made from wax. Other sources claim that the crescents were added due to foreign influence. Today it is widely believed that these crescents were marks of quality used by various mints.

Other than crescents, there were several Kaiyuan Tongbao coins with other reverse decorations, these include:

English (nick)name	Traditional Chinese	Simplified Chinese	Differentiating characteristic	Image
Crescent Moon Kaiyuan Tongbao	月紋開元通寶	月纹開元通宝	Has a crescent on its reverse.	
Pregnant Star Kaiyuan Tongbao	孕星開元通寶	孕星開元通宝	Has a dot on its reverse.	
Double Moons Kaiyuan Tongbao	雙月開元通寶	双月開元通宝	Has two crescents on its reverse.	
Star and Moon Kaiyuan Tongbao	星月開元通寶	星月開元通宝	Has both a crescent and a dot on its reverse.	
Auspicious Clouds Kaiyuan Tongbao	雲紋開元通寶	云纹開元通宝	Has clouds on its reverse.	
3 Moons Kaiyuan Tongbao	波紋開元通寶	波纹開元通宝	Has 3 crescents on its reverse.	
4 Moons Kaiyuan Tongbao	四月開元通寶	四月開元通宝	Has 4 crescents on its reverse.	
4 Stars Kaiyuan Tongbao	四星開元通寶	四星開元通宝	Has 4 dots on its reverse.	

Early Kaiyuan Tongbao coins are easily identified due to their deeply cut characters that never touch the rim of the coin, these are called "separate from the rim" Kaiyuan Tongbao coins (simplified Chinese: 隔轮開元通宝; traditional Chinese: 隔輪開元通寶; pinyin: gélún kāiyuán tōng bǎo), while the reverse of these coins tend to have uniform and clear rims. Later variants of the Kaiyuan Tongbao often have excess metal between the strokes of the Hanzi characters and even later variants have characters with strokes so long that they touch the rim, meanwhile the rims on the reverse side of these Kaiyuan Tongbao coins tend to be irregular and relatively flat.

== Huichang era Kaiyuan Tongbao cash coins ==
Huichang Kaiyuan Tongbao (simplified Chinese: 会昌開元通宝; traditional Chinese: 會昌開元通寶; pinyin: huìchāng kāiyuán tōng bǎo) cash coins are a series of Kaiyuan Tongbao coins produced under Emperor Wuzong who was a devout Taoist and used the reign era name of huìchāng (會昌), during the 5th year of this epoch (845) Emperor Wuzong ordered the casting of new coins with the inscription Kaiyuan Tongbao to be manufactured of bronze acquired by melting confiscated statues, copper bells, gongs, incense burners, and other copper items from Buddhist temples. These local mints were under the control of the provincial governors. The New Tang History states that Li Shen, governor of Huainan province, requested that the empire might cast coins bearing the name of the prefecture in which they were cast, and this was agreed. These Kaiyuan Tongbao cash coins differed from earlier variants due to the fact that they had the character chāng (昌) on their reverse side, other mints in China then adopted this and soon 23 mints produced Kaiyuan Tongbao coins with their own mint marks. Huichang Kaiyuan Tongbao coins are also of inferior workmanship compared to earlier coins and are diminutive in size. When Emperor Emperor Xuanzong ascended to the throne in the year 846, the aforementioned policy was reversed, and the new coins were recast to make Buddhist statues.

The following mint marks could be found on Huichang Kaiyuan Tongbao cash coins:

Mint mark (Traditional Chinese)	Mint mark (Simplified Chinese)	Pinyin	Place of issue	Image
昌	昌	Chāng	Huichang	
京	京	Jīng	Jingzhao (Note: There exists a rare version of this coin that has a mirrored version of this mint mark.)	
洛	洛	Luò	Luoyang	
益	益	Yì	Yizhou	
荊	荆	Jīng	Jingzhou	
襄	襄	Xiāng	Xiangzhou	
藍	蓝	Lán	Lantian (Note: There exists a variant that has three clouds on the reverse. Another uncommon Huichang era coin from Lantian has the four character reverse inscription tài píng dà wáng (太平大王).)	
越	越	Yuè	Yuezhou	
宣	宣	Xuān	Xuancheng	
洪	洪	Hóng	Hongzhou	
潭	潭	Dǎn	Changsha (Note: There exists a lead version of this coin.)	
兗	兖	Yǎn	Yanzhou	
潤	润	Rùn	Jiangsu	
鄂	鄂	È	Ezhou	
平	平	Píng	Pingzhou	
興	兴	Xīng	Xingyuan	
梁	梁	Liáng	Liangzhou	
廣	广	Guǎng	Guangzhou	
梓	梓	Zǐ	Dongchuan	
福	福	Fú	Fuzhou (Note: The majority of the Huichang Kaiyuan Tongbao coins minted in Fuzhou have the mint mark above the squar hole while there are less common versions with the mint mark either to the right or below the square hole.)	
桂	桂	Guì	Guiyang or Guizhou	
丹	丹	Dān	Danzhou	
永	永	Yǒng	Yongzhou (Note: Huichang Kaiyuan Tongbao cash coins with the "yong" (永) mint are the rarest.)	

== Turtle shell coins ==
13 Kaiyuan Tongbao turtle shell coins (traditional Chinese: 玳瑁幣; simplified Chinese: 玳瑁币; pinyin: Dàimào bì), made from Hawksbill sea turtle shell, were discovered at the Famen Temple in 1987. In 1987 a large number of treasures dating to the Tang dynasty period were uncovered at the site. Among the over 27,000 cash coins found at the temple there were 13 turtle shell cash coins with the inscription Kaiyuan Tongbao, they have a diameter of 2.75 centimeters, a thickness of 0.06 centimeters, and a weight of 24.8 grams.

In Buddhism turtle shells are among the 7 treasures and these cash coins may have been made to commemorate a very special occasion. Likely by the order of a Tang dynasty emperor to honour a sacred relic of Gautama Buddha that was located at the Famen Temple.

"《佛說陀羅尼集經》中曰：“其七寶者：一金二銀三珍珠四珊瑚五玳瑁六水晶七琉璃”.

This tantra states that there are seven "treasures" or precious things: (1) gold, (2) silver, (3) pearl, (4) coral, (5) turtle shell, (6) crystal, (7) colored glaze."

— Dharani Samuccaya Sutra (佛說陀羅尼集經, Fú shuō tuóluóní jí jīng), translated into English by Gary Ashkenazy (加里·阿什凱納齊) from the Primal Trek – a journey through Chinese culture website.

As no mention of these turtle shell Kaiyuan Tongbao cash coins exist in any historical records or text both Chinese archaeologists and numismatists were surprised with the find. Experts do note that the number of the coins (13) is considered auspicious in Buddhism, which may be related to the fact that there are 13 turtle shell coins. This is further reflected in there being 13 sects in Chinese Mahayana Buddhism, 13, floors at the Tibetan Potala Palace and that the Famen Pagoda (where the coins were found) also had 13 floors.

As of 2021 these were the oldest known turtle shell coins found anywhere in the world.

== Other variants ==
Description	Image
There is a lead Kaiyuan Tongbao cash coin of uncertain attribution (being either produced by Ma Chu or the Southern Han). While the Tang dynasty period Kaiyuan Tongbao cash coins tended to be copper-alloy uniform-sized coins with inscriptions in clerical script, these lead cash coins are typically poorly-cast with very irregular and poorly written characters. Furthermore, these lead coins are smaller, thinner, and lighter than the original Kaiyuan Tongbao and contain larger square central holes indicating that they have less metal than the original coins they were based on. Another noticeable difference between the original copper-alloy Kaiyuan Tongbao cash coins from the Tang dynasty and the later made lead Kaiyuan Tongbao cash coins is that the inscription of the lead versions are read counterclockwise (top, left, bottom, right) as opposed to the original ones which are read top-to-bottom, right-to-left. Furthermore, the way that these characters are written is also unorthodox with the first character Kai (開, "Open") being written upside down, the Yuan (元, "Primal", "Beginning"), is rotated to the right so the top of this character is actually facing the centre square hole, the Tong (通, "To circulate"), is rotated to the left with the right side of the character facing the square centre hole, and the fourth character, Bao (寶, "Treasure"), being written upside down.	
There is a copper-alloy cash coin presumably made following the collapse of the Tang dynasty with the inscription Kaiyuan Zhongbao (開元重寶), the exact origins of this Kaiyuan Zhongbao are unknown being possibly an amulet or a later made Japanese copy. One such Kaiyuan Zhongbao sold in 2011 at the China Guardian Auctions for about $925. The Kaiyuan Zhongbao is a relatively well-made copper-alloy cash coin with its inscription written in largely uniform character which only slightly differ in size. It is 33 mm in diameter as opposed to the 24 mm of the original Kaiyuan Tongbao, this is likely because at the time "Zhongbao" (重寶) cash coins were valued at 10 wén as opposed to "Tongbao" (通寶) cash coins which were only valued at 1 wén.	
There is a lead Kaiyuan Zhongbao (開元重寶) cash coin which rather than featuring the character Bao (寶) has a picture of a sycee (silver and gold ingots) on its left side. The shape of the sycee is illustrated in the most common shape so it would be easily recognisable by Chinese people, as sycees were a very high denomination form of money, they would therefore represent a "treasure" and would easily substitute the actual word, meaning that people could easily recognise it. The actual origins of this "Kaiyuan Zhongsycee" coin are unclear, it was found in the same area as other lead Kaiyuan Tongbao cash coins and were likely produced by either Ma Chu or Southern Tang.	
There is unique a later made variant of the Kaiyuan Tongbao with the inscription Kaiyuan Zhongtong (開元通重), this inscription is quite unusual because typically the character "Tong" (通) indicates that a cash coin has a denomination of 1 wén, while the character "Zhong" (重) typically means that a cash coin was valued at 10 wén. The person who owns this unique cash coin thinks that whoever made the cash coin mould was likely just careless and they mistakenly used "重" instead "寶" and speculates that the Kaiyuan Zhongtong may be the earliest known specimen of any Chinese cash coin having such a clerical error to have been discovered. If the Kaiyuan Zhongtong was produced due to an error in the production of its mould nobody at the time of its production either noticed or seemed to care about its inscription, though it is likely that only a small number of cash coins with this inscription were cast from the mould as only a single specimen has ever been found (as of 2021).	

== Mintage figures ==
The maximum annual output of mints during the Tang dynasty was 327,000 strings (327,000,000 cash coins).

== Counterfeit coins ==
Counterfeit cash coins (traditional Chinese: 惡錢; simplified Chinese: 恶钱; pinyin: È qián; lit. 'Bad money') were rampant during the Tang dynasty period, counterfeit Kaiyuan Tongbao cash coins were of inferior quality, they were typically lighter or were made with alloys containing larger percentages of cheaper metals, such as iron and lead, reducing the Intrinsic value of the cash coins in circulation. The Old Book of Tang claims that the Jianghuai region, the two capital (Chang'an and Luoyang) regions, the Hebei region, and the Nanling region were most seriously affected by counterfeit cash coins. The introduction and circulation of counterfeit cash coins negatively affected the economy by causing inflation and reducing social stability.

The emergence of coin counterfeiting in China is rooted in the development of the commodity economy and the scarcity of money. The counterfeiting of cash coins prevailed due to a number of factors, primarily based on the market demand for money, while the production of official cash coins was being constrained by the prohibitively high costs associated with their manufacture. The cost of casting wasn't just affected by production costs such as the volume of fuel and manpower, but also by acquisition costs relating to the scarcity of copper, as well as the cost of transportation. These factors all created a market incentive to produce counterfeit cash coins to fill the demand for currency.

The government of the Tang dynasty explicitly forbade coin counterfeiting and actively took measures to eliminate the bad Kaiyuan Tongbao cash coins that were illegally produced. Despite their efforts, the crackdown on counterfeit cash coins proved largely to be unsuccessful. Despite the official regulations requiring government mints to cast cash coins with high copper content, examinations of the chemical composition of official Kaiyuan Tongbao cash coins reveal higher tin and lead contents that don't match the official alloy compositions mentioned in the historical records. A 2004 analysis revealed that officially produced Kaiyuan Tongbao cash coins were on average 70.21% copper, 17.85% lead, and 8.64% tin, the researchers hypothesised that counterfeit cash coins were probably those with exceptionally high lead content (>36 wt%). Researcher Liu of the Chinese numismatic society believed that the government regulations requiring high copper content in the official alloys were only introduced to curb the cash coin counterfeiting.

== Influence outside of China ==
=== Japan ===
Japanese "Fuhonsen" and later the Wadōkaichin were modelled after the Tang dynasty's Kaiyuan Tongbao coin using similar calligraphy.

=== Sogdia ===
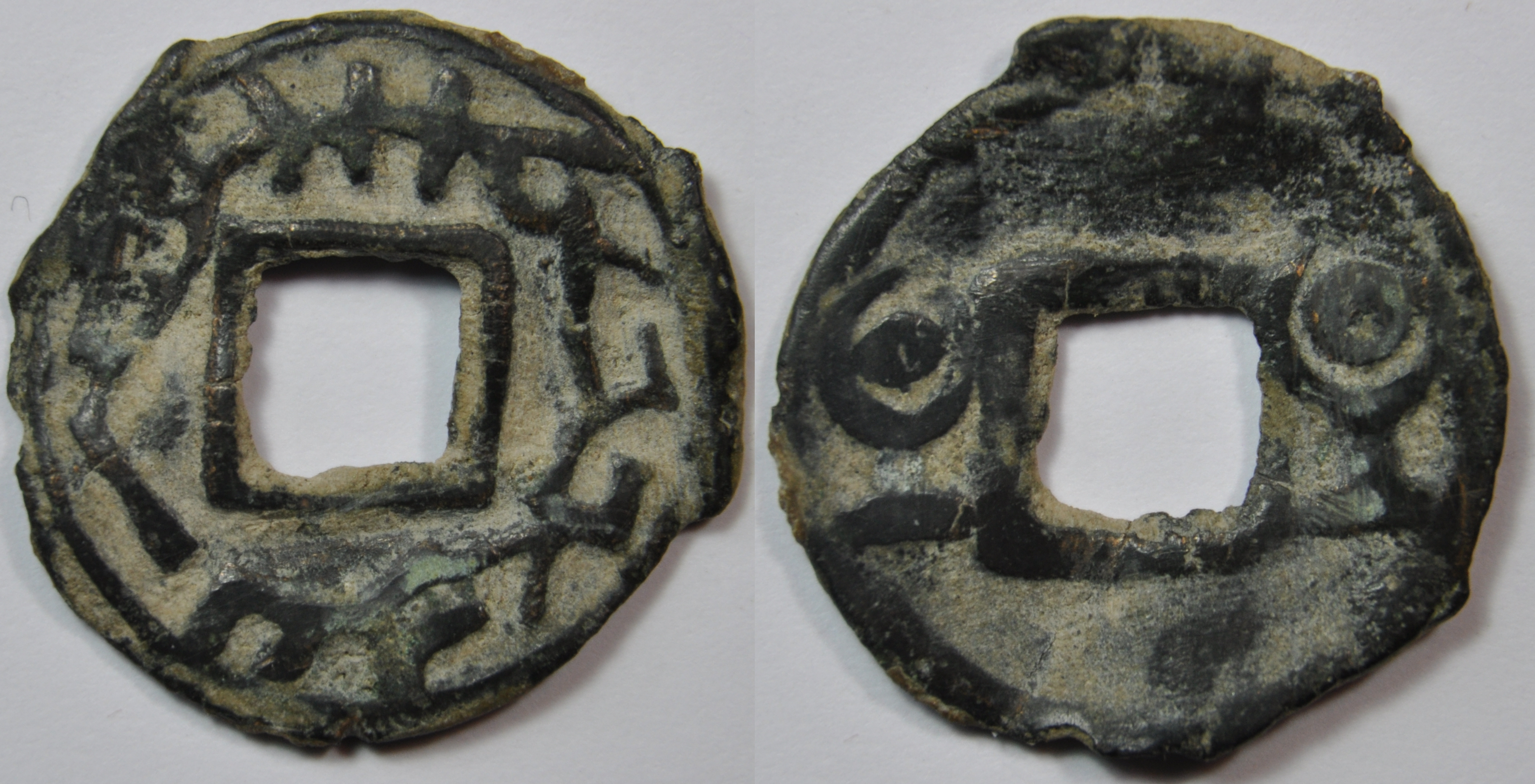
A Sogdian cash coin.

During excavations in the historically Sogdian cities of Afrasiab (old Samarkand) and Pendjikent a large number of Sogdian coins were uncovered, the Soviet numismatist Smirnova listed in her catalogue on Sogdian coins from 1573 published in 1981 a large number of coins of which several were based on Kaiyuan Tongbao's. Sogdian coins tend to be produced independently by each city and contain tribal mint marks known as tamgha's, some cities used coins based on Persian coinages (which made up 13.2% of the known variants), while others preferred Chinese cash coins which were influenced by the Tang dynasty's western expanse during the seventh century (cash style coins also made up the majority of Sogdian coins and accounted for 86.7% of all known variants), as well as hybrid coins which feature an image based on a square hole on one side of the coin and a portrait of the King in the other side (these made up 0.7% of the known variants).

A number of Sogdian coins even imitate the Kaiyuan Tongbao inscription directly, but on their reverses have added Sogdian tamgha's on the right or left side of the hole as well as the Sogdian word for "lord". The modern era these Sogdian Kaiyuan Tongbao coins are reproduced in large numbers by forgers in Hong Kong, these forgeries have proven to be very difficult to differentiate from the original coins and are abundant in quantity.

=== Vietnam ===
Vietnamese cash coins produced from the Đinh until the late Trần dynasty tend to be heavily based on the Chinese Kaiyuan Tongbao cash coins, an example would be the Lý dynasty era Thiên Tư Nguyên Bảo (天資元寶) cash coins cast under Emperor Lý Cao Tông which uses two distinct styles of Chinese calligraphy, one of them is a native Lý dynasty style and the other is based on the Kaiyuan Tongbao, often the Chinese character "Nguyên" (元) on older Vietnamese coins is copied directly from Chinese Kaiyuan Tongbao coins, particularly how the left hook of the character moves upwards, although variants of the characters in "pure Vietnamese styles" were cast simultaneously. Like many Kaiyuan Tongbao coins many of these early Vietnamese cash coins would add reverse crescents or mint marks which were often wholly borrowed from the calligraphic style of the Kaiyuan Tongbao. Every early Vietnamese cash coin that has a reverse inscription is based on the Kaiyuan Tongbao.

== Modern influence ==
- A Kaiyuan Tongbao cash coin appears on the reverse side of a 2010 Hong Kong banknote issued by the Standard Chartered Bank with a face value of $1,000.
- In 2013 a sculpture of a Kaiyuan Tongbao with a diameter of 24 meters (or 78.7 feet) and a thickness of 3.8 meters (or 12.5 feet) was constructed to be displayed at the Baoshan National Mining Park (宝山国家矿山工园) theme park in the Guiyang Prefecture of Chenzhou, Hunan. The sculpture is notably of a Huichang Kaiyuan Tongbao with the Gui (桂) mint mark.
- There is a 10-meter-tall (33 ft) Kaiyuan Tongbao-shaped door which stands on a bridge in the Jiangxia District of Wuhan, Hubei.

== Hoards of Kaiyuan Tongbao cash coins ==
List of hoards of Kaiyuan Tongbao (開元通寳) cash coins
Hoard	Image
A scrap metal collector named Nguyen Duc Dung found a hoard of Tang dynasty cash coins, while digging in a rice field on July 5, 2007, in Quảng Bình Province. Tran Anh Tuan, an artefact expert and the director of the Quảng Bình Provincial Museum, noted that Kaiyuan Tongbao cash coins circulated in Vietnam during this period as Vietnam was a part of China at the time. Nguyen Duc Dung was able to sell the cash coins for ₫ 200,000 (US$ 12.50) per kilogram, which had a total value ₫ 4,000,00 (US$250).	
On July 11, 2007, three refuse collectors had unearthed five terracotta jars, which contained 30 kilograms of Tang dynasty period Kaiyuan Tongbao cash coins in the Hàm Ninh commune, Quảng Ninh District, Quảng Bình Province.	
It was reported on 10 November 2011 by the Sichuan News Network (四川新闻网) that a large number of local residents of the Wenjiang District, Chengdu, Sichuan were recovering cash coins from the Golden Horse River (traditional Chinese: 金馬河; simplified Chinese: 金马河; pinyin: jīn mǎ hé). The Golden Horse River hoard is considered particularly unusual among Chinese coin hoards, because the bronze Chinese cash coins that were unearthed came from many different periods and dynasties in Chinese history spanning over two millennia. The local residents arrived with shovels, hoes, sickles, and any other equipment used for digging to search for more coins. Some of the local residents managed to dig up several kilograms of cash coins while other locals were only able to find ten or twenty cash coins. Soon the local police was alerted by the local authorities and they tried to cordon off the area to let the local Bureau of Cultural Relics dispatch archeologists to retrieve the cash coins. The treasure hunting done by the local residents was seen as "looting" because in accordance to the law of the People's Republic of China all cultural relics that are buried on land or discovered somewhere in the territorial waters or seas of China are at all times to be considered state property, and the local residents were asked by the police to "return" their findings. After the Chengdu archaeologists had arrived on the scene they had determined that the cash coins from the Golden Horse River board were strewn over an area approximately two hundred meters long and one hundred meters wide. Within only a short period of time the Chengdu archaeologists had managed to find over 5 kilograms of cash coins. The local archeologists stated that it was not practical to try to excavate the site or even attempt to preserve it because that there was a possibility of dangerous flood waters suddenly appearing. A few local archaeologists speculated as to why the cash coins were found there spun over such a large period of time, Mr. Liu Yumao (刘雨茂) noted that it was customary throughout Chinese history to place old cash coins into structures that were built for things such as irrigation and water conservancy, this superstition was done in the hopes of gaining good fortune and to avoid disaster. Liu Yumao further stated that the cash coins from the Golden Horse River hoard may have originally been buried inside of such a structure, and that later over time this structure had eroded and was washed. After this the cash coins could then have been carried across the river by the current and eventually ended at the site where they were found. As to why most of the unearthed cash coins came from the Tang dynasty period, local archeologist Mr. Wang Zongxiong (王仲雄) noted that it was possible that during this period a boat which was carrying coins across the Golden Horse River may have sunk and that the cash coins in its cargo were hidden underwater until they were found in 2011. While most cash coins found at the Golden Horse River hoard are Tang dynasty period Kaiyuan Tongbao and Qianyuan Zhongbao (乾元重寶), while other inscriptions of cash coins found at the Golden Horse River hoard range from Han dynasty period Wu Zhu (五銖), Xin dynasty Huo Quan (貨泉) to Manchu Qing dynasty period Qianlong Tongbao (乾隆通寶) as well as Guangxu coinage (光緒錢).	
During excavations of graves conducted on San Tau on Lantau Island in Hong Kong a number of coins were unearthed. Excluding a single Hong Kong ten-cent coin with a diameter of 2/05 centimeters, a thickness of 0.20 centimeters, and a weight of 5 grams issued in 1961, all coins found during the excavation were Tang dynasty period Kaiyuan Tongbao cash coins. Most of the unearthed Kaiyuan Tongbao cash coins were stacked which suggests that they were either strung together or kept in either a small bag or a pouch. The found cash coins were cast in different styles, sizes, thicknesses, and weights. All Tang cash coins had their inscriptions written in regular script. The smallest of the Tang coins were 2.40 centimeters in diameter while the largest were 2.60 centimeters. The grave with the most coins was identified as Grave G4.	
It was reported on January 25, 2013, that during a renovation of one of the rear halls of the Fuhaiyuan Temple (福海院) in Anxi County, Quanzhou, Fujian, a buried jar containing 27.5 kilograms of ancient Chinese cash coins was discovered. All of these cash coins date to the Tang dynasty period and have the inscription Kaiyuan Tongbao. Construction on the temple began in the year 900 and it remains unknown why the cash coins were buried there. A local official named Ms. Lin Meilian (林美莲) speculated that, despite the Fuhaiyuan Temple being the largest temple in the area during the Tang period, the cash coins might have been buried at the temple as a "rainy day fund".	
On February 20, 2013, workers digging at a construction site had unearthed a "money pit" that dated back some seven centuries in the city of Chenzhou, Anren County, Hunan. The "money pit" contained approximately 7.5 kg of cash coins dating from the late Southern Song dynasty period until the early Mongol Yuan dynasty period, with a few cash coins dating as far back as the Tang dynasty. The report on the find was covered by Mr. Cai Ning (蔡宁) of the Anren Prefecture Cultural Relics Administrative Office (安仁县文物管理所) and Mr. Duan Bangqiong (段邦琼) of the Anren Prefecture Bureau of Culture, Broadcasting and the Press (安仁县文广新局). Over 20 different inscriptions of Southern Song dynasty cash coins had been recovered at the site. The reported cash coin inscriptions from the hoard include (among others) the Tang dynasty period Kaiyuan Tongbao, Song dynasty period Chongning Tongbao (崇寧通寶), Chongning Zhongbao (崇寧重寶), Zhenghe Tongbao (政和通寶), Huangsong Tongbao (皇宋通寶), and Xianping Zhongbao (咸平重寶), and the Mongol Yuan dynasty period Dade Tongbao (大德通寶). Furthermore, the inscriptions mentioned by the news articles include Jingyuan Tongbao (景元通寶, Cảnh Nguyên Thông Bảo), which is sometimes attributed to Vietnam, but the cash coins true origins remain unknown, and Chunhua Tongbao (淳化通寶). What's notable about this find is that no historical sources or major Chinese coin catalogues ever mentioned either the Chunhua Tongbao (淳化通寶) cash coins or the Xianping Zhongbao (咸平重寶) cash coins, as these might have been cast during the same periods as the Chunhua Yuanbao (淳化元寶) cash coins and the Xianping Yuanbao (咸平元寶) cash coins, respectively. While no other Chunhua Tongbao cash coin has ever been known to exist prior to this find, another Xianping Zhongbao was unearthed in 2010 in Shaanxi. If the reports on these cash coins turn out to be true then this Anren County coin hoard would be considered a significant find in Chinese numismatics.	
In a news report broadcast by the Anhui TV Station (安徽卫视) on May 18, 2013, it was reported that Chinese archaeologists from the Guzhen County Bureau of Cultural Relics (固镇县文物局) dug up 500 pounds of cash coins in Guzhen County, Anhui. The cash coins were discovered stacked together in a very orderly manner. The Chinese archaeologists speculate that most of the cash coins they found would have been threaded together on strings and that they were then neatly arranged. However, by the time of the excavation the strings that held the cash coins together have long since rotted away and many of the unearthed cash coins were corroded together. The unearthed coins include Kaiyuan Tongbao cash coins from the Tang dynasty period, as well as Yuanfeng Tongbao (元豐通寶), Yuanyou Tongbao (元祐通寶), Chongning Tongbao (崇寧通寶) cash coins among others from the Northern Song dynasty period. The archeologists of the Guzhen County Bureau of Cultural Relics suspect that the cash coins probably belonged to a rich family during the Northern Song dynasty period that wanted to hide the money from robbers or during a time of unrest.	
In an April 25, 2013 article by the China News Service it was reported that the Kucha Bureau of Cultural Relics (库车县文物局) was informed of the discovery of a large number of Tang dynasty period Kaiyuan Tongbao cash coins at a construction site in Kuqa County, Xinjiang on April 23, 2013. By April 24 a team of archeologists had uncovered around 3000 Kaiyuan Tongbao cash coins, by this time the construction site was being managed by staff of the Kucha Bureau of Cultural Relics and the Qiuci Bureau of Public Security (龟兹公安分局) and more cash coins were continuing to be unearthed at the site. According to Ms. Yin Qiuling (尹秋玲), a cadre with the Kucha Bureau of Cultural Relics, the Kaiyuan Tongbao cash coins had been buried at the site for more than a millennium, and while the cash coins had acquired a patina, their legends could still be quite clearly read. The Kaiyuan Tongbao cash coins at the site were found scattered in an area that was about 10 meters long by 5 meters wide. It was later reported on May 2, 2013, that the number of unearthed Kaiyuan Tongbao cash coins at the site had almost reached 10,000.	
At approximately 10:00 AM on March 21, 2015, the excavator was dredging a small 6-meter wide river that runs through Longgang Town, Yancheng, Jiangsu had uncovered a pile of ancient Chinese cash coins dating to the Tang and Song dynasties that had been stored inside of an earthenware pot. After the word of the coin hoard had spread throughout the village, a number of local residents started to "treasure hunt" in the area looking for more old cash coins. The villagers had found around 200–300 catties (267–400 pounds, 121–181 kilograms) of cash coins before they were chased away by the police because it's illegal in the People's Republic of China to take "cultural relics" as they're all legally government property. Zhao Yongzheng (赵永正) of the Archaeology Department of the Yancheng Museum (盐城市博物馆考古部) noted that this coin cache was probably buried there somewhere at the beginning of the Southern Song dynasty period. The inscriptions of the unearthed cash coins included the Tang dynasty period Kaiyuan Tongbao, as well as the Song dynasty period Taiping Tongbao (太平通寶), Tiansheng Yuanbao (天聖元寶), Xiangfu Yuanbao (祥符元寶), Zhenghe Tongbao (政和通寶).	
On August 1, 2015, in the Qianjiang District, Chongqing, a woman named Wang Meiying (王美英), while collecting wood in the mountain area, had discovered a hole in which a large quantity of old cash coins were buried. The cash coins found in the hole weighed about 30 catties and consisted of over 4,000 cash coins, the inscriptions found on the coins cover a period of about 1400 years. The hoard includes Tang dynasty era Kaiyuan Tongbao cash coins, Song dynasty era Jingde Yuanbao (景德元寶) and Yuanfeng Tongbao (元豐通寶) cash coins, and Ming dynasty era Chongzhen Tongbao (崇禎通寶) cash coins. But 80% of the hoard consists of Qing dynasty coinage, namely Kangxi Tongbao (康熙通寶), Qianlong Tongbao (乾隆通寶), and Xianfeng Tongbao (咸豐通寶) cash coins. It was reported by a 75 year old villager from the area named Ms. Wan Jixiang (万继湘), that this area of the Qianjiang District did not use cash coins in the past and that the area housed no landlords or government officials that could have accumulated such an amount of wealth. As the area has had a long history of criminality, it was speculated by some locals that the cash coins may have been buried there long ago by bandits (土匪) who were on the run.	
On August 21, 2015, it was reported on by the government-owned Yueyang Daily (岳阳日报) that over a thousand Tang and Northern Song dynasty cash coins were discovered during the renovation of the Cishi Pagoda (慈氏塔) located in Yueyang, Hunan. Among the cash coins are a number of early Kaiyuan Tongbao cash coins from the Tang dynasty, as well as several Northern Song dynasty era inscriptions such as Chunhua Yuanbao (淳化元寶), Xianping Yuanbao (咸平元寶), Tianxi Tongbao (天禧通寶), and Tiansheng Yuanbao (天聖元寶). Ou Jifan (欧继凡), the Deputy-Director of the Yueyang Municipal Office of Cultural Relics (市文物管理处副主任), stated that the date major restoration was confirmed to be 1066 through an analysis of the cash coins. Ou Jifan further stated that there was an ancient tradition of burying coins during the construction and renovation of pagodas in China, as in the past people had believed that coins offered a form of protection to the pagoda that was being constructed or renovated, and that they furthermore would serve as a type of sacrifice to the heavens, and that the cash coins expressed the hope for peace. Earlier during the same restoration of the Cishi Pagoda in 2015 a covered alms bowl with the inscription "Da Song Zhiping San Nian" (大宋治平三年, "the 3rd year of Zhiping of the Great Song") was discovered, which also indicates that the pagoda underwent a major renovation in the year 1066.	
1.5 tonnes of cash coins dating back to the Tang and Song dynasties.	During an excavation in Shuangdun Village, Jianhu County of Yancheng City in the province of Jiangsu a coin hoard consisting of 1.5 tonnes of cash coins was discovered. This hoard included a large number of Kaiyuan Tongbao cash coins as well as later made coins dating to the Song dynasty period.

== See also ==
- Flying cash

== Sources ==
- Hartill, David (2005). Cast Chinese Coins. Trafford, United Kingdom: Trafford Publishing. ISBN 978-1412054669.
