= Wadōkaichin =

Coinage used in Japan from the 8th century to 958

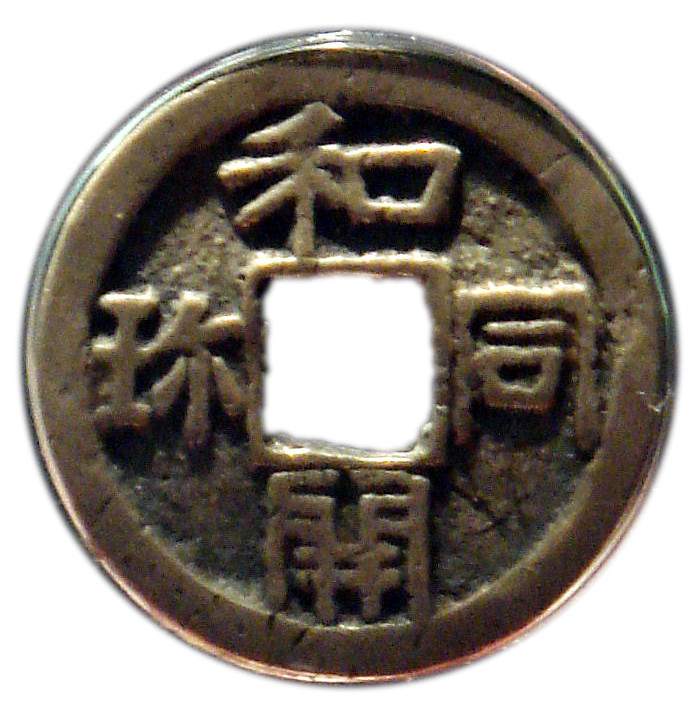
Silver wadōkaichin (和同開珎) coin, 8th century, Japan. Japan Currency Museum.

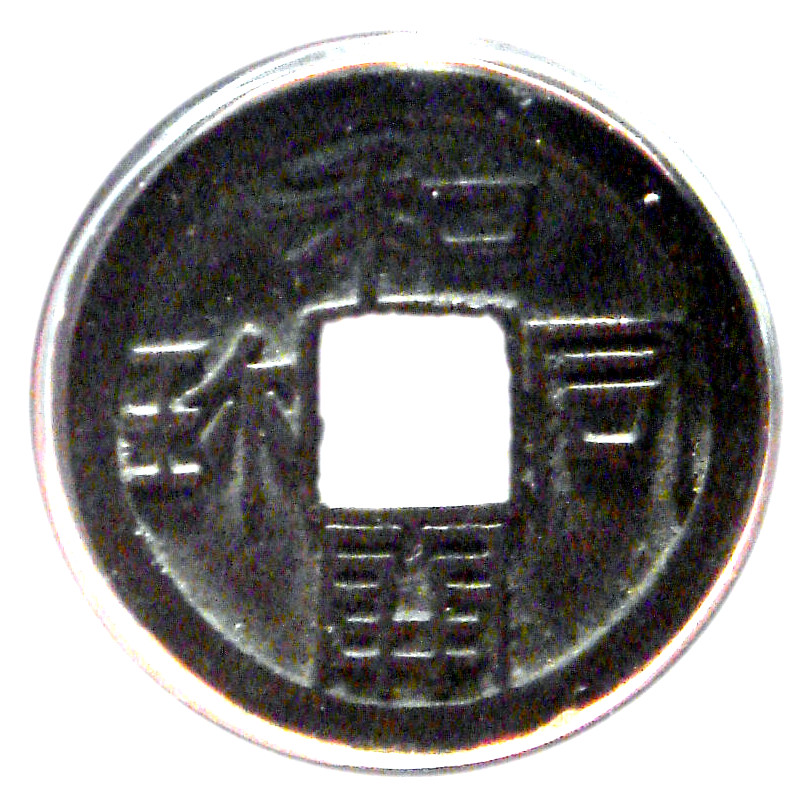
Wadōkaichin copper coin.

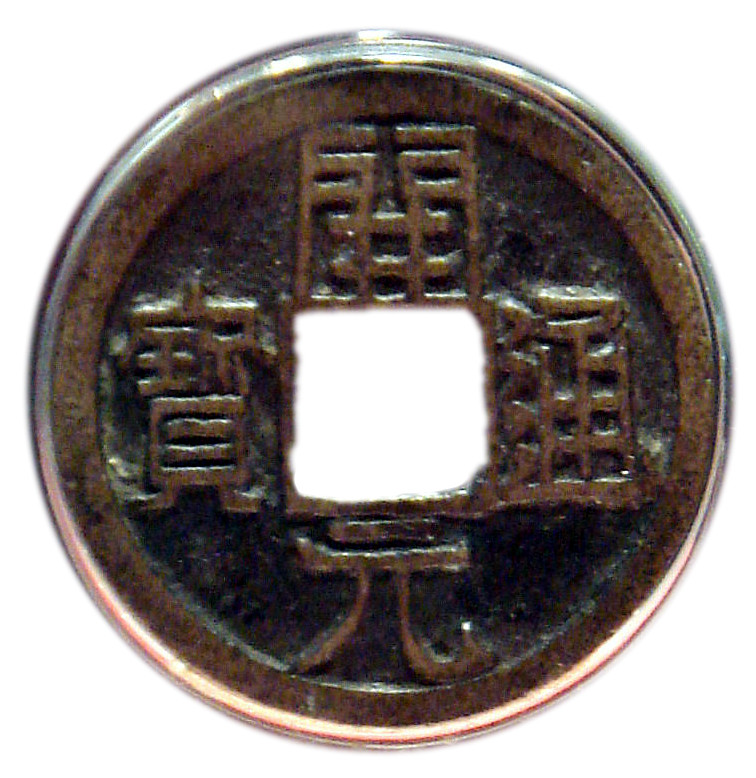
The Chinese Kāiyuán Tōngbǎo coin (開元通寶), first minted in 621 CE in Chang'an, was the model for the Japanese wadōkaichin.

Wadōkaichin (和同開珎), also romanized as Wadō-kaichin or called Wadō-kaihō, is the oldest official Japanese coinage, first mentioned for 29 August 708 on order of Empress Genmei. It was long considered to be the first type of coin produced in Japan. Analyses of several findings of Fuhon-sen (富夲銭) in Asuka have shown that those coins were manufactured from 683.

== Description ==
The wadōkaichin was first produced following the discovery of large copper deposits in Japan during the early 8th century at what is now the Wadō Archaeological Site.

The coins, which are round with a square hole in the center, remained in circulation until 958 CE. These were the first of a series of coins collectively called jūnizeni or kōchō jūnisen (皇朝十二銭).

This coinage was inspired by the Chinese Tang dynasty coinage (唐銭) named Kaigen Tsūhō (Chinese: 開元通宝, Kāiyuán tōngbǎo), first minted in Chang'an in 621 CE. The wadōkaichin had the same specifications as the Chinese coin, with a diameter of 2.4 cm and a weight of 3.75 g.

== Etymology ==
The name wadōkaichin comes from the Japanese pronunciation of the four characters in the coin's inscription: wa (和) dō (同) kai (開) chin (珎).

- The first two characters literally mean "harmony" (和, wa) + "together" (同, dō). This was likely chosen as a fortuitous homophone for the era name Wadō (和銅): the wa (和) is also used to mean "Japan", and dō (同) may also be a ryakuji or abbreviated character for dō (銅) or "copper", in reference to the Japanese copper deposits.
- The third character kai (開) literally means "opening; to open", with an additional sense of "start; first".
- The fourth character (珎) is unusual. It is considered to be either a variant form of chin (珍) meaning "rare, precious", or a ryakuji or abbreviated character for hō (寳) meaning "treasure, something precious". This difference in interpretation gives rise to the alternative name for the coins, wadōkaihō. Based in part on further research into writing conventions during the Nara period, the broad consensus in modern research appears to be the chin (珍) interpretation.

→ Together, the third and fourth characters likely mean "first currency".

== Hoards of Wadōkaichin cash coins ==
In February 2015 Japanese archeologists discovered ritual jars filled with wadōkaichin and jingō kaihō (神功開寳) cash coins at the Tehara ruins in Rittō, Shiga Prefecture. The jars were placed there as a part of a Buddhist ritual, which indicates that the site was likely a government office or the resident of an important local.

On August 17, 2015 four wadōkaichin cache coins were discovered at the East Pagoda of Yakushi-ji, Nara during a restoration. The wadōkaichin were located 1.3 meters east of a foundation rock at the bottom of the 1.7 meter-deep base of the East Pagoda of the temple. Experts from the Nara National Research Institute for Cultural Properties and the Nara Prefectural Archeological Institute of Kashihara believe that the wadōkaichin were buried at the East Pagoda during the groundbreaking ceremony of the Buddhist temple and that these cache coins were used for purification purposes. According to the experts, this discovery at the Yakushi-ji is the oldest known example of the ancient Japanese practice of burying a cache of widely-circulated coins to purify a construction site anywhere in Japan.

== See also ==
- Ryō (Japanese coin)
- Japanese mon (currency)
- Wadō (era)
- Economy of Japan
