= Bitasen =

Japanese coin type

- Japan
- Value: 1 Mon
- Edge: Smooth
- Shape: Circular
- Years of minting: 1404–c.1625 (Note: Bitasen circulated until 1670)

Obverse
- Design: Chinese characters

Reverse
- Design: Usually blank

Bitasen (Japanese: 鐚銭) is a privately minted mon type coin that circulated in Japan from the middle of the Muromachi period to the early Edo period. These low quality imitation Chinese cash coins were made to aid the supply of cash coins (authentic) that flowed into Japan from China. The Japanese populance widely despised them, giving these coins the name bitasen or "bad metal" (bita).

== History ==
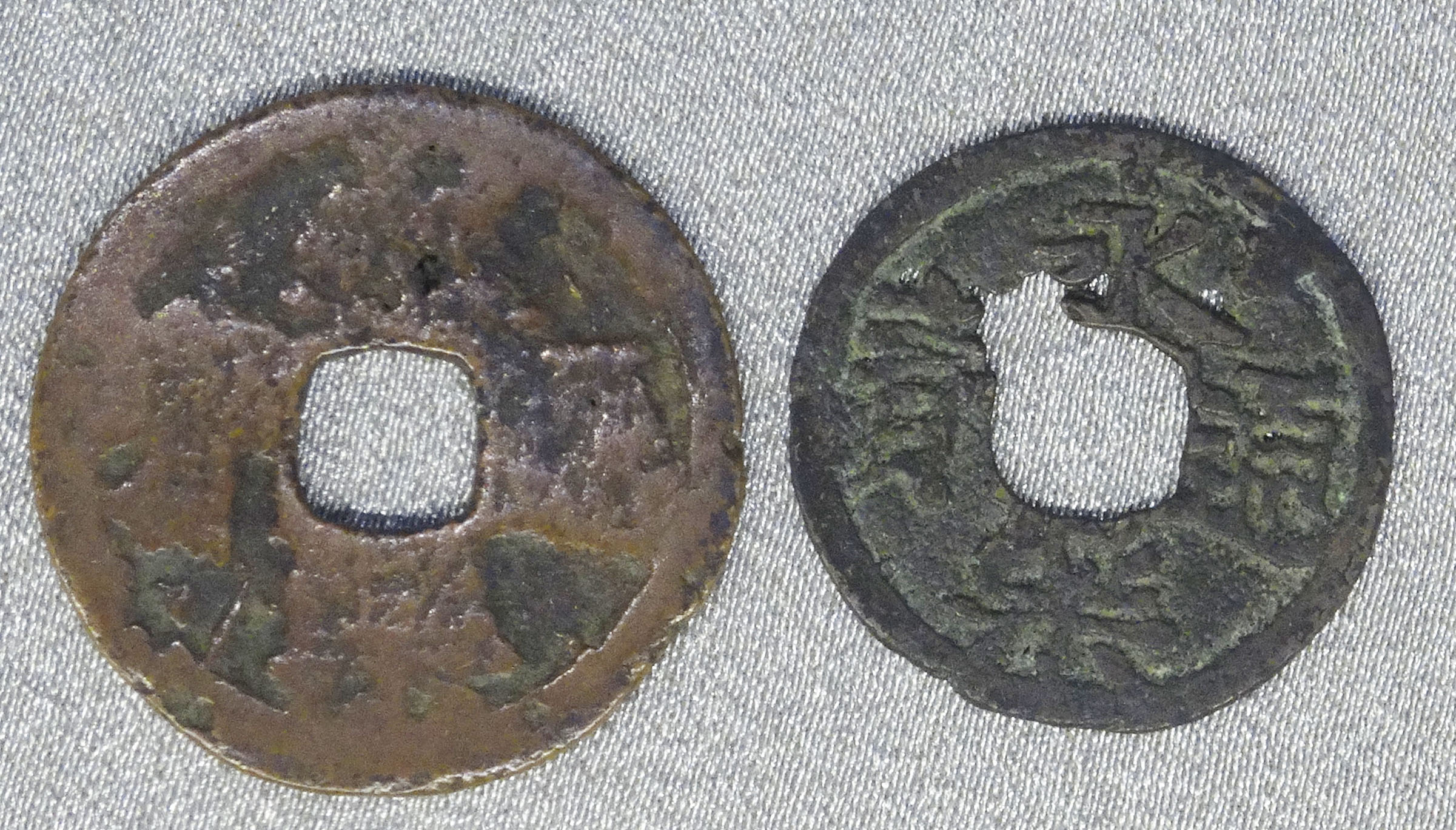
"Bitasen" from the late Muromachi period

In the mid-12th century, large amounts of Chinese coins called "toraisen" were introduced to Japan. By the 13th century these coins had replaced commodity money as currency after the Kamakura shogunate's initial reluctance gave way to approval. As the "mere import of coins" could not meet the needs of a growing economy, Japanese clans and wealthy merchants began to issue their own coins which are referred to as Shichūsen (私鋳銭) a.k.a. privately minted Japanese coins. While sources agree on the Muromachi period as a starting point for "bitasen"/"toraisen" co-circulation there are differing opinions on an exact date. Mentions include the year 1404 by the Japan Mint, while others give a later period in the 16th century. By definition, the word bitasen translates to "bad metal" ("Bita") or poor-quality coins with worn surfaces. These coins were essentially imitation money which was struck in copper with "significant" amounts of lead to match the "toraisen" cash coins already in circulation.

Bitasen had a fluctuating value that depended on their worth relative to the "toraisen". Regional markets initially made their own decisions on the bitasen's value until the shogunate established a uniform valuation that was used in every Japanese region. As per their namesake, Bitasen were coins "of inferior quality" that remained in circulation for a "long time" due to an overall lack of currency available at the time. This in turn took its course on Japanese consumers throughout the 15th century who were irritated by the increasing number of damaged and worn-out coins. Bitasen were frequently no longer accepted at their face value due to a practice called "erizeni", in which they were sorted out in favor of "toraisen". Though Chinese coins would continue to circulate in Eastern Japan, the confusion and chaos caused by the Bitasen coinage caused rice to replace copper coinage in Western Japan.

Although Bitasen were officially prohibited in 1608 by the Tokugawa shogunate, these coins continued to illegally circulate. The shogunate responded to this by opening more mines for the production of copper, silver, and gold coinages. The end for the Bitasen instead came in the form of Kan'ei Tsūhō, which was first issued in 1626. Due to the isolationist policies of the Tokugawa shogunate, the outflow of currency halted and Kan'ei Tsūhō coins would continue to stay the main coin circulating in Japan. In 1670, the Eiraku Tsūhō was completely prohibited from circulation and depreciated in favor of the government produced Kan'ei Tsūhō cash coins.

== Types ==
Obverse	Reverse	Japanese name	Chinese name	Minted	Origin
		Eiraku Tsūhō (Note: These coins are also known as Iutsushi (鋳写し) or "cast a copy from". As the name implies, these coins are cast coinage of their Chinese counterparts.)	Yongle Tongbao (永樂通寶)	1404 – c.1625	Japan
		Shōfu Tsūhō (天下手祥符)	Xiang Fu Tong Bao (祥符通寶)	c.1501 – c.1525	Japan
		Kōbu Tsūhō (加治木銭)	Hongwu Tongbao (洪武通寶)	c.1575 – c.1625	Kajiki, Kagoshima (Note: Present day: Aira, Kagoshima)
		Heian Tsūhō (平安通宝)	None (Note: This may be a Japanese copy of a Vietnamese cash coin)	c.1600 – c.1625	Kyushu
		Genyū Tsūhō (元祐通寶)	Yuan You Tong Bao (元祐通寶)	Unknown	Japan
		Katou bitasen (加刀鐚銭)	Various	—N/a	China (Note: These coins originated in China and were later carved with a tool in Japan to add or modify the Chinese characters. Katou bitasen are recognized in the Japanese book Honpo Bitasen Zufu (本邦鐚銭図譜) (1982).)
