= Japanese mon (currency) =

Coins used from 1336 to 1891

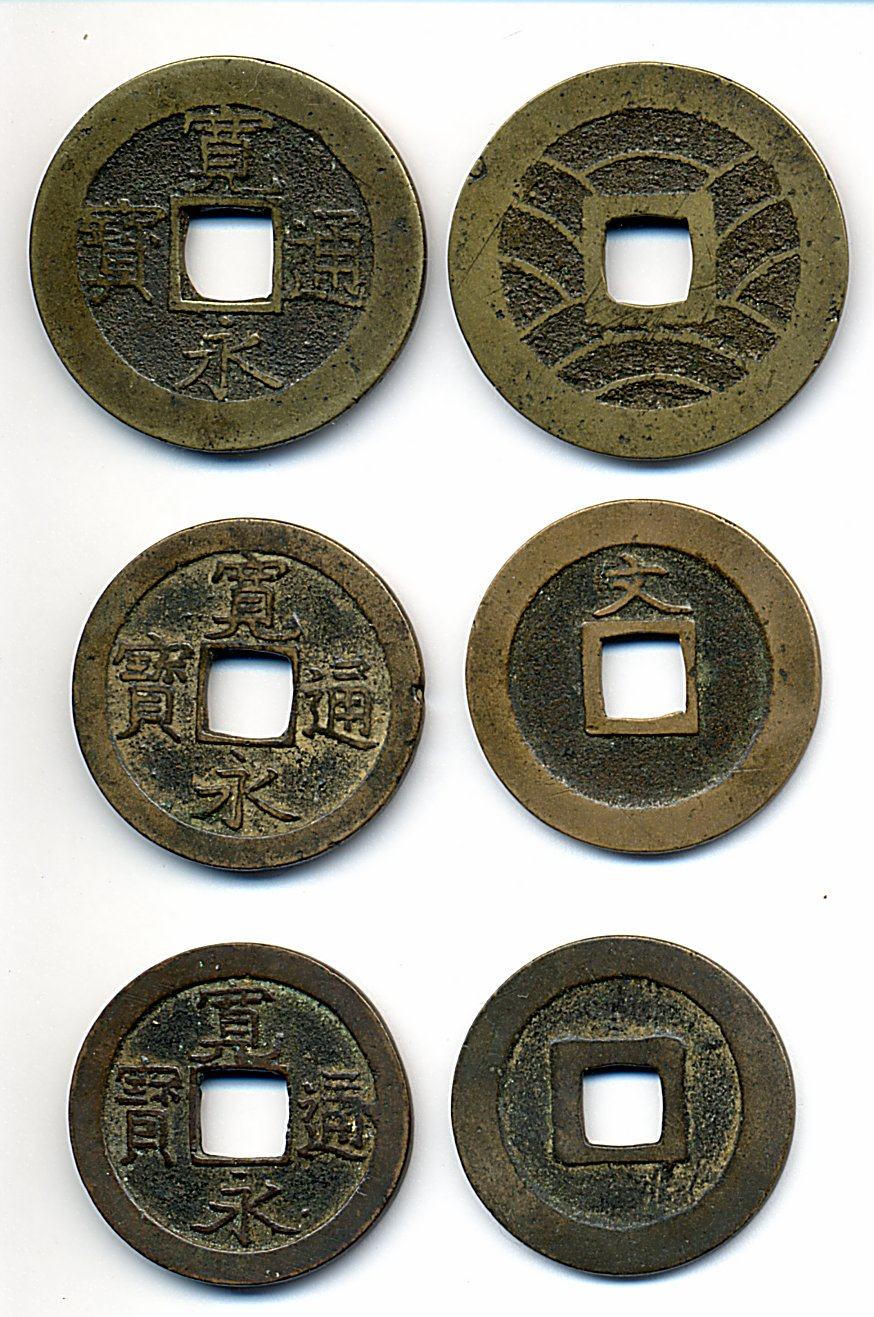
Kan'ei Tsūhō (寛永通宝) coins. The top coins were each worth 4 mon; the middle and bottom coins were worth 1 mon each.

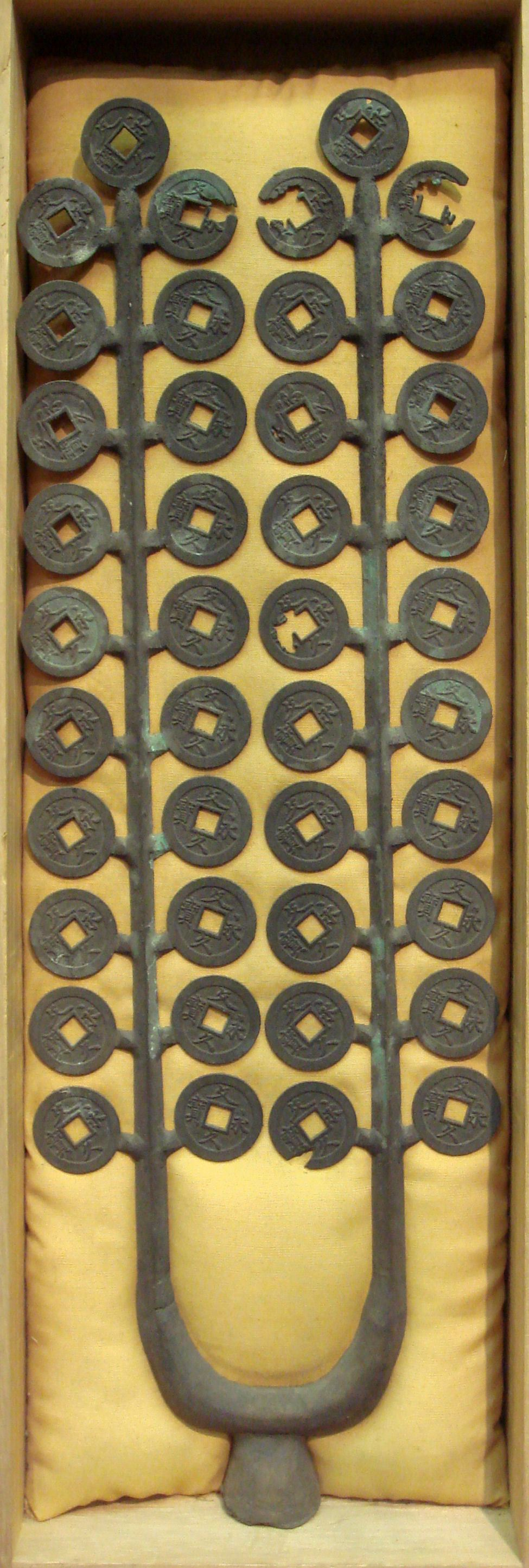
Bunkyū ēhō (文久永宝). Branched ("Edasen" 枝銭) Mon coins of the Bunkyū period. This shows the foundry technique to make the coins: the coins would then be clipped and filed to obtain the final round shape.

The mon (文) was the currency of Japan from the Muromachi period in 1336 until the early Meiji period in 1870. It co-circulated with the new sen until 1891. Throughout Japanese history, there were many styles of currency of many shapes, styles, designs, sizes and materials, including gold, silver, bronze, etc. The kanji for mon (文) also shares its name with Chinese wén, Korean mun, and Vietnamese văn.

== Denominations ==
Coins denominated in mon were cast in copper or iron and circulated alongside silver and gold ingots denominated in shu, bu and ryō, with 4000 mon = 16 shu = 4 bu = 1 ryō. In 1869, due to depreciation against gold, the new fixing officially was set for 1 ryō/yen = 1,000 mon. The yen started to replace the old non-decimal denominations in 1870: in the 3rd quarter of 1870, the first new coins appeared, namely 5, 10, 50 sen silver and 2, 5, 10, 20 Yen. Smaller sen coins did not appear before spring, 1873. So the mon coins (1, 4, 100, 250 mon etc.) remained a necessity for ordinary peoples commodities and were allowed to circulate until 31 December 1891. From January 1, 1954, onward, the mon became obsolete: postwar inflation had removed sen, mon etc. denominations smaller than 1 Yen. Due to the missing small coinage, the Japanese posts issued their first stamps (Meiji 4.3.1 / 1871.4.20) in mon and fixed postal rates in mon until April 1872 (Meiji 5.2.28).

During the co-existence of the mon with the sen between 1870 and 1891, the metal content of the old currency became important. Official exchange for coins from 1871.6.27: 4 copper mon = 2 rin, 1 bronze mon = 1 rin (1 rin = 1/10 of a sen). So while not all mon were valued equally, their metal kind counted after the transition to decimal sen: bronze was valued more highly than copper. The first physical rin denomination was introduced in 1873 with the 1 rin coin (with the 5 rin coin introduced in 1916), as until that time the rin had existed only as an accounting unit (10 rin = 1 sen). The most current coin, the Tenpō Tsūhō (天保通寶, a coin with a face value of 100 mon) was valued at only 8 rin (0.8 sen) in that sen period.

In Japanese currency, there were 5 words in use. 文 (mon) and 貫 (kan) were used in the old days (before Meiji). 1 kan literally denotes a stringful of mons, and generally contained 1000 mon. After Meiji, 銭 (sen) and 円 (yen) were used instead. 1 yen = 100 sen. The kanji 銭 can also be read as zeni. When it is read as zeni, it denotes generic "money" rather than the specific money of 1 sen = 0.01 yen.

== History ==
=== Toraisen, and Shichūsen ===
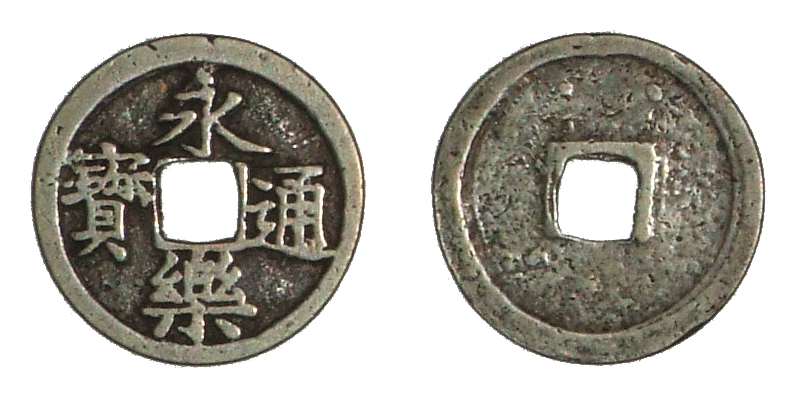
An Eiraku Tsūhō (永樂通寳) coin, one of the most commonly circulating coins of the era before the Edo period.

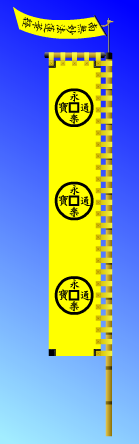
The flag (Nobori) of Oda Nobunaga displaying Chinese Eiraku Tsūhō coins.

Though the production of copper, silver, and gold coins had already started in the eighth century, they were not often used as a medium for exchange until later when the Japanese started importing Chinese coins, which replaced the Japanese commodity currency economy. As internal trade grew due to agricultural and handicraft developments, the people started preferring coinage to barter, leading to a growth of demand for copper coins. The Southern Song dynasty prohibited the export of its coinage in 1179 due to its problem with the outflow of currency, but shiploads of Chinese coins would still enter Japan annually through Ningbo. There is evidence to suggest that the Yuan dynasty used to extensively export Chinese cash coins to Japan for local circulation. The Sinan shipwreck, which was a ship from Ningbo to Hakata that sank off the Korean coast in the year 1323, carried some 8,000 strings of cash coins, which weighed about 26,775 kilograms (59,029 lb).

Since the trade had begun with Japan, and they received payment in Chinese coins for Japanese goods, they stopped minting their own copper coinage until 1587. The Ashikaga shogunate imported Kōbu Tsūhō (洪武通寶), Eiraku Tsūhō (永樂通寳), and Katei Tsūhō (嘉靖通寶) from the Ming dynasty, which they referred to as Toraisen (渡来銭) or Minsen (明銭), but the high demand for copper coinage inspired local and private production of copper coins (Shichūsen, 私鋳銭). An example of a Shichūsen used for trade with China and the Ryukyu Kingdom would be a Kōbu Tsūhō coin minted by Satsuma domain which included the character "治" (Ji) on the reverse indicating that it was minted at the town of Kajiki, while still using the inscription of the Hongwu Emperor of Ming China. Some Shichūsen would also bear the inscriptions of coins from the Song dynasty, although it was not uncommon for many coins to simply be recasts and copies of older Song and Ming dynasty coins in the form of Iutsushi (鋳写し) or by simply adding extra carvings on existing circulating Chinese coins.

Bitasen refers to the Shichūsen coinage produced in Japan by the nobility and private local mints, and not by the imperial government or before the establishment of the Tokugawa shogunate which were often poor in appearance, as well as damaged and worn out imported Chinese coins.

=== Kan'ei Tsūhō ===
In 1636, the Kan'ei Tsūhō (Kyūjitai: 寛永通寳; Shinjitai: 寛永通宝) coin was introduced by the government of the Tokugawa shogunate as a means to standardise copper coins and keep up a sufficient supply of copper coinage, being the first government minted copper coin in 700 years, despite this however they were introduced in the Mito domain 10 years prior during the 3rd year of the Kan'ei era. These coins would become the daily currency of the common people and would be used for small payments. Due to the isolationist policies of the Tokugawa shogunate, the outflow of currency halted and Kan'ei Tsūhō coins would continue to stay the main coin circulating in Japan. Kan'ei Tsūhō were minted for 230 years despite the fact that the Kan’ei era ended in 1643, and coins would continue to bear the Kan’ei legend, even when a new denomination of the coin was introduced a century later, though they were not all uniform as the shogunate outsourced the mintage to regional and local merchants who would cast them at varying weights and sizes, as well as occasionally having local mint marks. By the 1650s 16 private mints were opened for the production of Kan'ei Tsūhō coins all over Japan. Kan'ei Tsūhō produced before 1688 are referred to as "old Kan’ei" and are recognisable by their similar calligraphic styles making them hard to differentiate from one another, meanwhile Kan'ei Tsūhō coins produced after 1688 (or "new Kan’ei" coins) tend to be more diverse in calligraphic styling, and the 4 mon denomination has waves on its reverse making it easily distinguishable from other coins.

From 1738 the government authorised the manufacture of iron Kan'ei Tsūhō 1 mon coins, and in 1866 (just before the end of the Edo period) iron 4 mon Kan'ei Tsūhō were authorised. While iron coins were being minted, the quality of copper coins would decrease due to frequent debasements.

=== Export ===
As Bitasen coins were no longer allowed to circulate within Japan, Japanese traders started selling them on foreign markets for profits, especially on the Vietnamese market where a huge influx of Eiraku Tsūhō and Kan'ei Tsūhō coins from Japan made the Japanese mon the de facto currency of the region. The large export of Japanese coins to Vietnam during this period mostly happened on Red seal ships.

Years	Annual number of Red seal ships going to Northern Vietnam	Annual number of Red seal ships going to Southern Vietnam
1604–1605	5	9
1606–1610	2	9
1611–1615	3	26
1616–1620	9	22
1621–1625	6	7
1626–1630	3	5
1631–1635	9	9

From 1633 the Tokugawa government adopted the isolationist Sakoku policy. The Shogunate, however, opened up the seaport of Nagasaki to export with the Dutch East India Company and Chinese merchant ships from Southeast Asia. The Japanese merchants who were now prohibited from exporting mon coins directly to Vietnam used the Dutch traders as middlemen and exported, between 1633 and 1637, around 105,835 strings of 960 Eiraku Tsūhō and Kan’ei Tsūhō coins (or 101,600,640 mon) to Vietnam. From 1659 this continued with the Nagasaki trade coins which were specifically minted for foreign markets; this is why they were escribed with Song dynasty inscriptions as coins from the Song dynasty were already circulating in Southeast Asia and the populace had already become accustomed to them. The trade of mon coins stopped however after the Shogunate banned the export of copper in 1715.

=== Inflation during the Bakumatsu ===
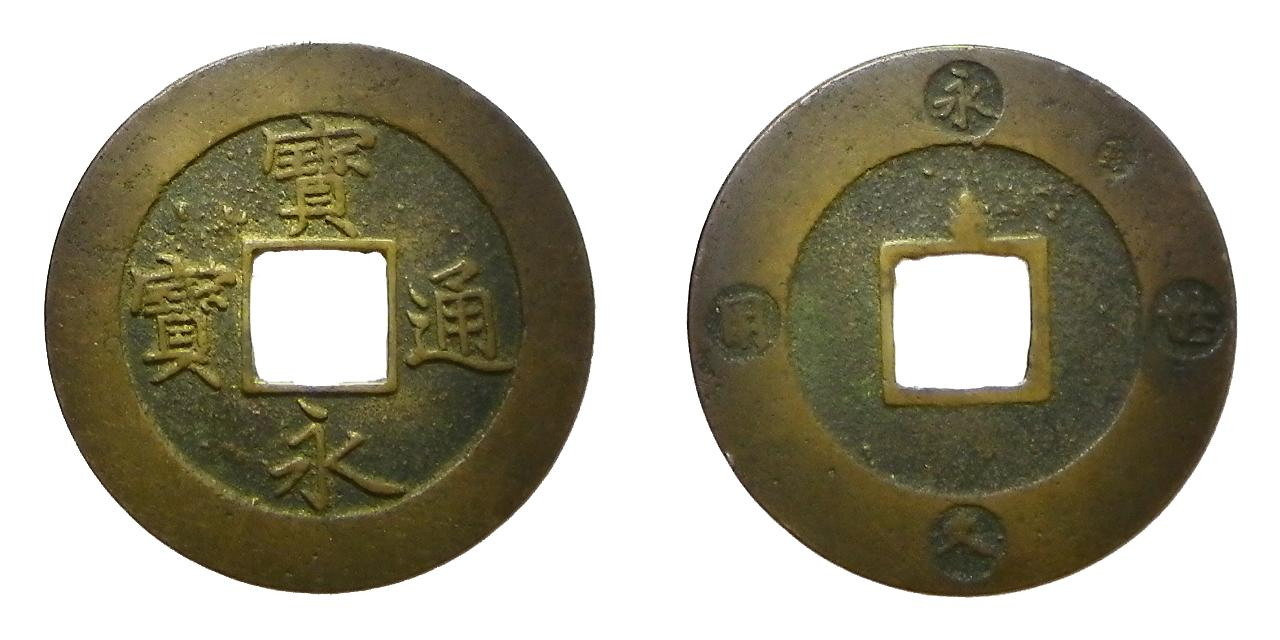
A Hōei Tsūhō (寳永通寳) coin, these were unsuccessfully introduced as a large denomination 10 mon coin in 1708, but failed because of their debased copper content.

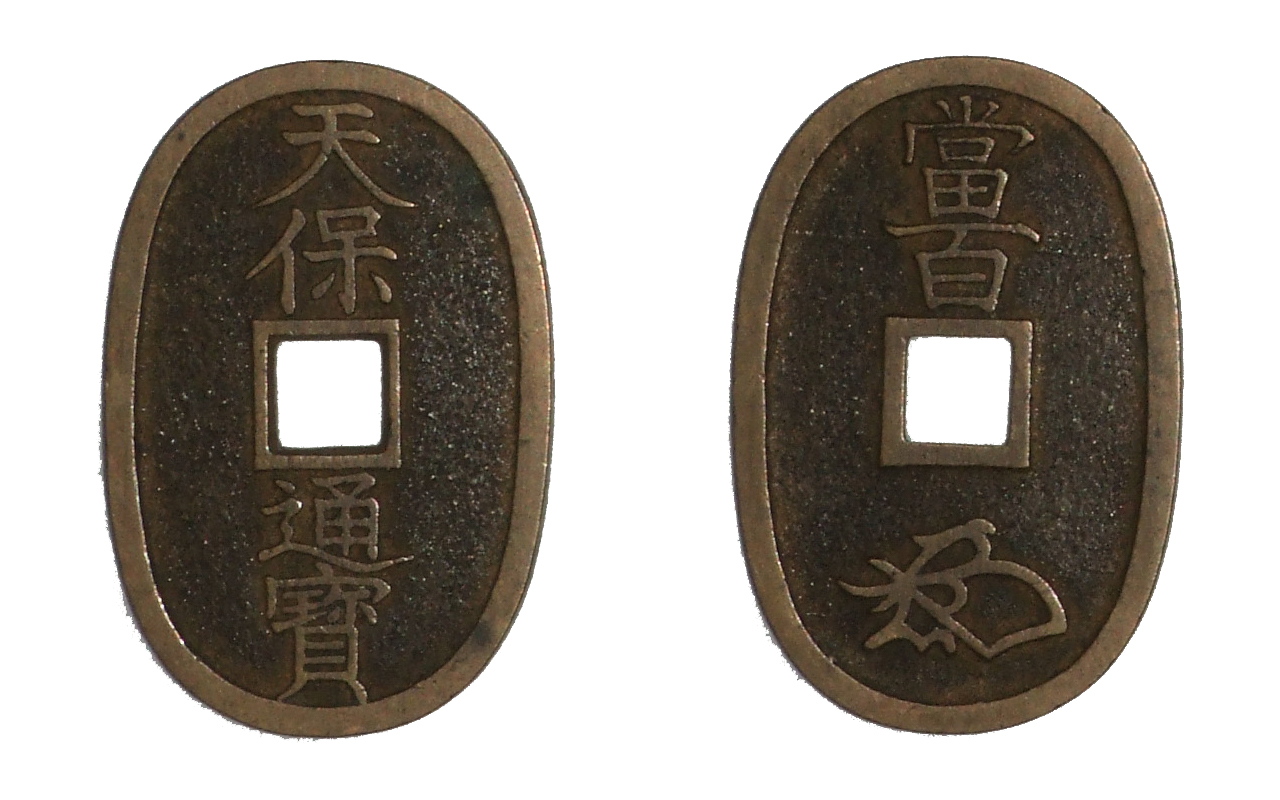
A Tenpō Tsūhō (天保通寳 - 當百) coin of 100 mon, with the Kaō of the Kinza mint's Gotō San'emon.

In 1708 the Tokugawa shogunate introduced the Hōei Tsūhō (Kyūjitai: 寳永通寳; Shinjitai: 宝永通宝) which had a face value of 10 mon (but contained 3 times as much copper as a 1 mon Kan’ei Tsūhō coin), which lead to the coin being discontinued very shortly after it started circulating as it was not accepted for its nominal value.

However, in 1835 (during the Bakumatsu) the Tokugawa shogunate tried issuing a larger denomination copper coin again with the Tenpō Tsūhō 100 mon coin which this time only contained five and a half times the amount of copper in a 1 mon coin, but was accepted nonetheless. The introduction of this denomination caused large scale inflation comparable to that of caused by the 100 wén coin minted by the Qing dynasty in 1853, or the 100 mun coin issued by the Kingdom of Joseon in 1866. The reason for the change in mentality was the scarcity of copper which had earlier forced the Japanese to mint iron coins breaking the previously established tri-metallic system. The concurrent circulation of 1, 4, and (heavily debased) 100 mon coins caused for a chaotic reaction from the market, as did widespread circulation of forged coinage.

Another major cause for inflation was that from 1859 local Daimyō started minting their own coinage often with high denominations to increase the money supply or to get more gold and silver for their low copper supplies. In 1862 this inspired Daimyō Shimazu Nariakira to produce Tenpō Tsūhō derivatives in the form of 100 on Ryūkyū Tsūhō coins and even ½ Shu Ryūkyū Tsūhō coins under the pretence of minting coins for their vassal Ryukyu Kingdom, this proved profitable for the Satsuma domain.

== Stringing of coins ==
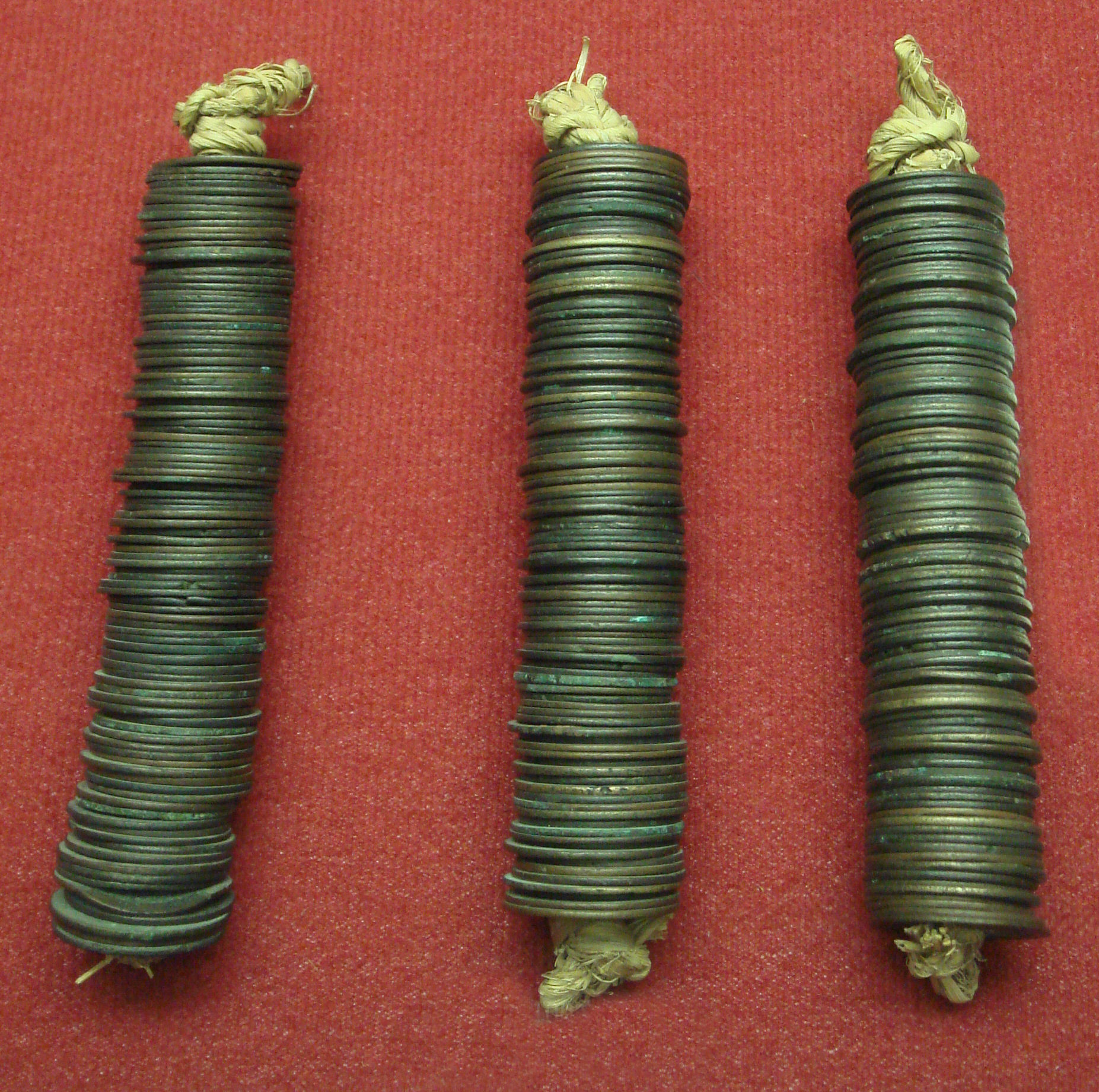
Bundles of 100 copper mon coins strung together for convenience of both transportation and payment.

Mon coins were holed, allowing them to be strung together on a piece of string. In the Edo period of Japan (1615-1868), stringed together coins received a small discount when presented like this. For example, for 100 mon payment: if those 100 mon coins were all tied in a row, the discount given was 4 mon, so 96 stringed coins of 100 mon were accepted at par with 100 mon. Similar discounts probably existed for other bulk payments with small coinage in stringed form.

== List of Japanese mon coins ==
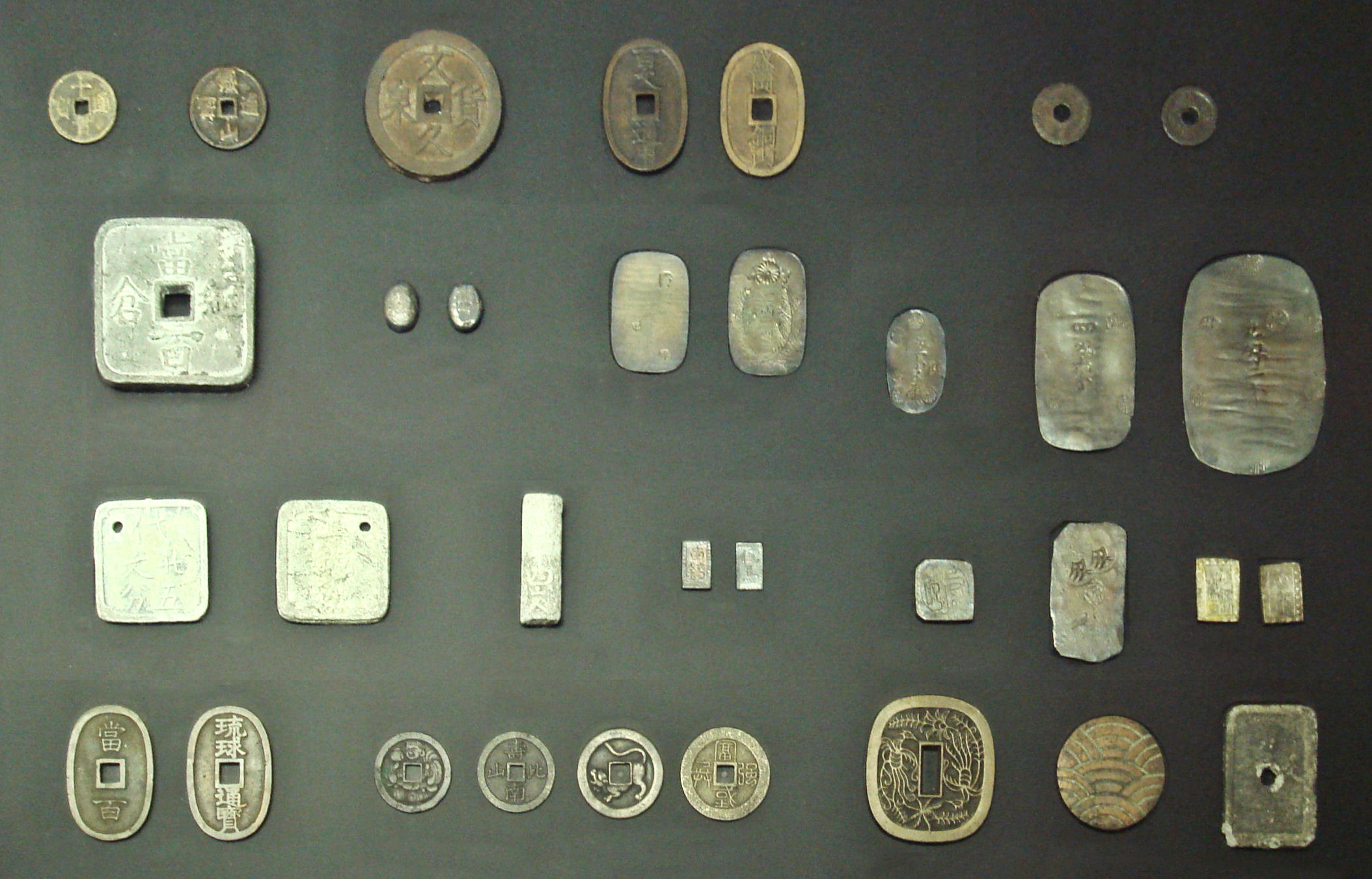
Proliferation of local Japanese coinage during the Bakumatsu period.

During the history of the Japanese mon, many coins with different inscriptions were cast. The main coins cast by the central government were:

Inscription	Kyūjitai	Shinjitai	Year of introduction (Gregorian calendar)	Nengō (Japanese calendar)	Denomination(s)	Image
Keichō Tsūhō	慶長通寳	慶長通宝	1606	Keichō 11	1 mon	
Genna Tsūhō	元和通寳	元和通宝	1616	Genna 2	1 mon	
Kan'ei Tsūhō	寛永通寳	寛永通宝	1626 (1 mon) (Note: The Kan'ei Tsūhō was first minted in 1626 (Kan'ei 5) in the Mito domain on a small scale, but the Tokugawa government started mass producing the coin in 1636 (Kan'ei 15).); 1768 (4 mon)	Kan'ei 5 (1 mon); Meiwa 5 (4 mon)	1 mon 4 mon	
Hōei Tsūhō	寳永通寳	宝永通宝	1708	Hōei 5	10 mon	
Tenpō Tsūhō	天保通寳	天保通宝	1835	Tenpō 6	100 mon	
Bunkyū Ēhō	文久永寳	文久永宝	1863	Bunkyū 3	4 mon	

Many Japanese domains produced their own currency, which happened chaotically, so that the nation's money supply expanded by 2.5 times between 1859 and 1869, leading to crumbling money values and soaring prices.

These coins were often produced with the name of the domain or province on them. The mon coins produced by domains are:

Inscription	Kyūjitai	Shinjitai	Domain	Image
Sendai Tsūhō	仙臺通寳	仙台通宝	Sendai	
Hosokura tō hyaku	細倉當百	細倉当百	Sendai	
Isawa Tsūhō	膽澤通寳	胆沢通宝	Sendai	
Tetsuzan Tsūhō	鐵山通寳	鉄山通宝	Morioka	
Hakodate Tsūhō	箱館通寳	箱館通宝	Matsumae	
Dōzan Tsūhō	銅山通寳	銅山通宝	Kubota	
Ashū Tsūhō	阿州通寳	阿州通宝	Tokushima	
Tosa Tsūhō	土佐通寳	土佐通宝	Tosa	
Chikuzen Tsūhō (100 mon)	筑前通寳 - 當百	筑前通宝 - 当百	Fukuoka	
Ryūkyū Tsūhō (100 mon)	琉球通寳 - 當百	琉球通宝 - 当百	Satsuma	
Ryūkyū Tsūhō (½ Shu)	琉球通寳 - 半朱	琉球通宝 - 半朱	Satsuma	

== See also ==
- Wadōkaichin
- Economy of Japan
- Japanese numismatic charm

=== Currencies with the same etymology ===
- Chinese wen
- Korean mun
- Vietnamese văn
- Ryukyuan mon
