= Hongwu Tongbao =

Chinese cash coin minted 1368–1393

Hongwu Tongbao (洪武通寶)
- Ming dynasty (China) (Note: Imitations of the Hongwu Tongbao were cast in Japan.)
- Value: 1 wén, 2 wén, 3 wén, 5 wén, 10 wén
- Composition: Copper-alloy (bronze)
- Years of minting: 1368–1393

Obverse
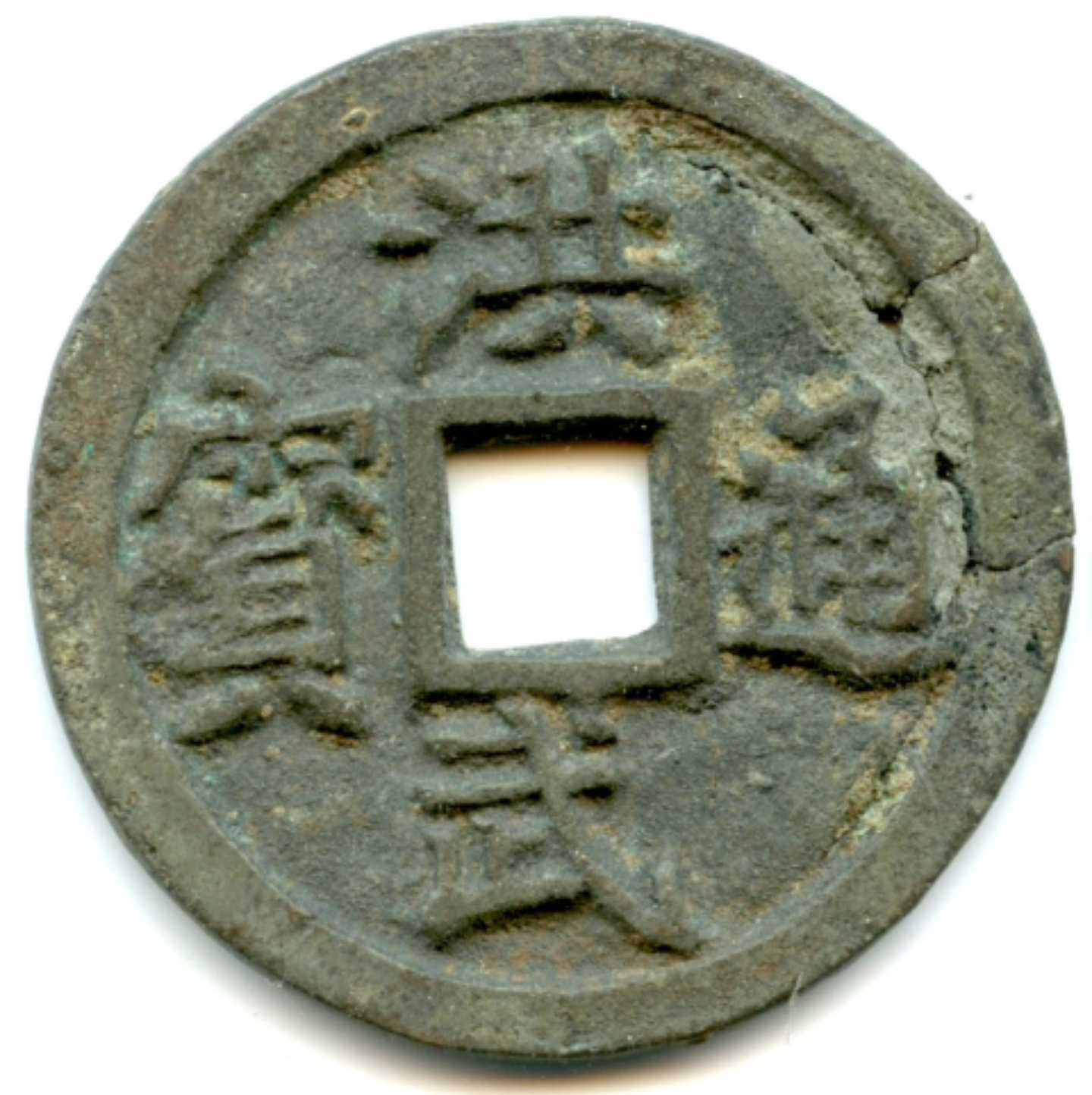
- Design: Hongwu Tongbao (洪武通寶)

Reverse
- Design: Some versions are blank, while others have reverse inscriptions.

The Hongwu Tongbao (simplified Chinese: 洪武通宝; traditional Chinese: 洪武通寶; pinyin: Hóngwǔ tōng bǎo; lit. 'vastly martial circulating treasure' Japanese: Kōbu Tsūhō) was the first cash coin to bear the reign name of a reigning Ming dynasty Emperor bearing the reign title of the Hongwu Emperor. Hongwu Tongbao cash coins officially replaced the earlier Dazhong Tongbao (Chinese: 大中通寶) coins, however the production of the latter did not cease after the Hongwu Tongbao was introduced. The government of the Ming dynasty placed a greater reliance on copper cash coins than the Yuan dynasty ever did, but despite this reliance a nationwide copper shortage caused the production of Hongwu Tongbao cash coins to cease several times eventually leading to their discontinuation in 1393 when they were completely phased out in favour of paper money. In the year 1393 there were a total of 325 furnaces in operation in all provincial mints of China which had an annual output of 189,000 strings of cash coins (or 1,890,000 cash coins annually) which was merely 3% of the average annual production during the Northern Song dynasty.

Japanese Kōbu Tsūhō cash coins continued to be manufactured well into the seventeenth century as a result of trade with China which caused Ming dynasty era cash coins to circulate in Japan.

== History ==
In 1361 the Minting Department of the Board of Works (寶源局) was set up in Ying Tian Fu (Nanjing) by Zhu Yuanzhang who at the time ruled under the title of "Prince of Wu" and created the mint before the Yuan dynasty was driven out of China. The first cash coins issued by Zhu Yuanzhang actually bore the inscription "Dazhong Tongbao" (大中通寶) because he wanted to name his country the "Great Zhong dynasty" (大中朝) but eventually the name was settled on the "Great Ming dynasty" (大明朝) and the Hongwu period was proclaimed and the introduction of the Hongwu Tongbao (洪武通寶). Despite the new coinage being issued the Dazhong Tongbao would continue to be cast as reconquering China from the Mongols would take several years, one of the reasons why it is confirmed that the production of the Dazhong Tongbao was continued well into the Hongwu period is because Dazhong Tongbao cash coins with mintmarks from Fuzhou, Fujian have been produced despite the Fuzhou mint only opening its doors in 1394, other Dazhong Tongbao cash coins without any reverse mint marks are presumed to have been cast in either the Jiangxi, Shaanxi, Sichuan, or Yunnan mints when these mints were in operation. Mints were established in various cities and provinces including Nanjing, Beiping, Henan, Jinan, Zhejiang, Fujian, Hubei, Guangdong, and Guilin. From 1375 each Chinese provincial mint (寶泉局) was required by the government to mark the reverse side of each cash coin with both its value and place of casting. In Jiangxi there were 115 furnaces in operation for the production of cash coins while in provinces where copper was less abundant the government ordered the people to hand in their copper for the production of cash coins.

The production of the Hongwu Tongbao cash coins itself was started in the year 1368, bronze cash coins were cast in five denominations which included 1 wén (小平), 2 wén (折二), 3 wén (折三), 5 wén (折五), and 10 wén (當十), however in 1371 the production of larger sized Hongwu Tongbao and Dazhong Tongbao cash coins were discontinued due to the fact that people did not accept them for their nominal value on the market. Between the years 1375 and 1376 the production of cash coins was completely stopped but was later resumed, however a national shortage of copper forced the government of the Ming dynasty to completely suspend the manufacture of cash coins in 1387 for a period of two years, after the mintage of Chinese cash coins was resumed in 1389 the standard weights were set where copper Hongwu Tongbao coins of 1 wén would weigh 1 qián, 2 wén weighed 2 qián, 3 wén weighed 3 qián, 5 wén weighed 5 qián, and 10 wén weighed 1 liǎng, while in 1390 the weight of the 1 wén Hongwu Tongbao cash coins was increased to 1.2 qián. It was also officially stipulated by law that the Hongwu Tongbao cash coins would be made from 100% copper and that 160 of the 1 qián cash coins would be made from one jin (斤) of copper. The complete production of Chinese copper cash coins was suspended in the year 1393 when the usage of copper coinage was also made illegal in favour of the Da Ming Baochao banknotes.

From this point the government of the Ming dynasty did not produce any copper coinage at a large scale until the Yongle Tongbao (永樂通寳) was cast for foreign trade between 1408 and 1410, while the production of copper cash coins for domestic circulation did not resume until the introduction of the Hongzhi Tongbao (弘治通寶) in 1503 by the Beijing mint.

=== In Japan ===
In Japan a large number of imported Ming dynasty cash coins (明銭) started circulating as Shichūsen (私鋳銭) from the sixteenth century. On the island of Kyushu a village named Kajiki in the Satsuma Domain produced a large quantity of cash coins between the late sixteenth and early seventeenth centuries as Satsuma had a very active trade with the Ryukyu Kingdom, these imitations of Ming dynasty cash coins bore the inscription "Kōbu Tsūhō" but had the Kanji character "治" (Ji) on its reverse to indicate that it was struck in Kajiki.

== Mint marks ==
List of mint marks on Hongwu Tongbao cash coins:

Mint mark	Issuing mint	Image
1 wén
一錢 (Yi Qian)		
京 (Jing)	Nanjing mint	
北平 (Bei Ping)	Beiping mint	
鄂 (E)	Hubei province mint	
福 (Fu)	Fujian province mint	
廣 (Guang)	Guangdong province mint	
桂 (Gui)	Guilin mint, Guangxi province	
桂一 (Gui Yi)	Guilin mint, Guangxi province	
濟 (Ji)	Jinan mint, Shandong province	
豫 (Yu)	Henan province mint	
浙 (Zhe)	Zhejiang province mint	
2 wén
二錢 (Er Qian)		
京 (Jing)	Nanjing mint	
北平 (Bei Ping)	Beiping mint	
鄂 (E)	Hubei province mint	
二福 (Er Fu)	Fujian province mint	
廣二 (Guang Er)	Guangdong province mint	
桂二 (Gui Er)	Guilin mint, Guangxi province	
濟 (Ji)	Jinan mint, Shandong province	
豫 (Yu)	Henan province mint	
浙 (Zhe)	Zhejiang province mint	
3 wén
三 (San)		
三錢 (San Qian)		
京 (Jing)	Nanjing mint	
北平 (Bei Ping)	Beiping mint	
鄂 (E)	Hubei province mint	
三福 (San Fu)	Fujian province mint	
廣三 (Guang San)	Guangdong province mint	
桂三 (Gui San)	Guilin mint, Guangxi province	
濟 (Ji)	Jinan mint, Shandong province	
豫 (Yu)	Henan province mint	
浙 (Zhe)	Zhejiang province mint	
5 wén
五 (Wu)		
五錢 (Wu Qian)		
京 (Jing)	Nanjing mint	
北平 (Bei Ping)	Beiping mint	
鄂 (E)	Hubei province mint	
五福 (Wu Fu)	Fujian province mint	
廣五 (Guang Wu)	Guangdong province mint	
桂五 (Gui Wu)	Guilin mint, Guangxi province	
濟 (Ji)	Jinan mint, Shandong province	
豫 (Yu)	Henan province mint	
浙 (Zhe)	Zhejiang province mint	
10 wén
十 (Shi)		
十一兩 (Shi Yi Liang)		
京十 (Jing Shi)	Nanjing mint	
北平十 (Bei Ping Shi)	Beiping mint	
鄂十 (E Shi)	Hubei province mint	
十福 (Shi Fu)	Fujian province mint	
十廣 (Shi Guang)	Guangdong province mint	
桂十 (Gui Shi)	Guilin mint, Guangxi province	
濟十 (Ji Shi)	Jinan mint, Shandong province	
十豫 (Shi Yu)	Henan province mint	
十浙 (Shi Zhe)	Zhejiang province mint	

=== Japanese mint marks ===
Mint mark	Issuing mint	Image
治 (Ji)	Kajiki, Satsuma Domain	

== Hongwu Tongbao charms ==
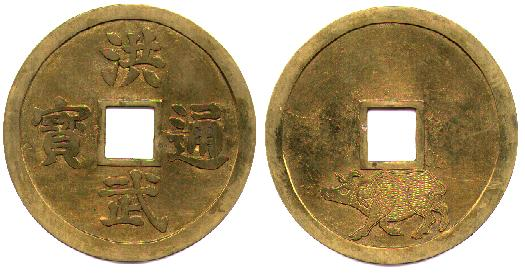
A Hongwu Tongbao (洪武通寶) charm or amulet which is 119 millimeters in diameter that depicts an ox (or bull) on its reverse alluding to the simple life of Zhu Yuanzhang before he became the Hongwu Emperor.

Chinese numismatic charms with the inscription "Hongwu Tongbao" (洪武通寶) are common however those with graphic depictions of the life of Zhu Yuanzhang only began to appear after the Xinhai revolution overthrew the Qing dynasty and established the Republic of China in 1912, this was because casting or having in one's possession a "coin" which showed the life of a Chinese emperor during the imperial period would lead to them facing almost certain death. However, as the threat of punishment for circulating these charms disappeared in 1912 they became more commonplace. The reason why Hongwu Tongbao charms and amulets became very popular with the Chinese masses is because these amulets represented the hope that those who come from less than fortunate beginnings may grow up to become the Emperor, this was because Zhu Yuanzhang was born to an impoverished peasant family, his parents died while he was very young, became a beggar, later found employment as a shepherd boy, and eventually moved to live in a Buddhist monastery. As he saw the injustices the Chinese people were suffering under the rule of the Yuan dynasty he joined the red turban rebellion and through his own ability managed to lead the rebellion and restore Chinese independence from foreign rule establishing the Ming dynasty with himself as its Emperor Taizu. This story inspired many commoners to believe that they and their offspring could amount to become successful despite their own humble beginnings, for this reason Chinese charms and amulets that carried the inscription "Hongwu Tongbao" became very popular and many of these usually depict either a part of or the entire aforementioned story.

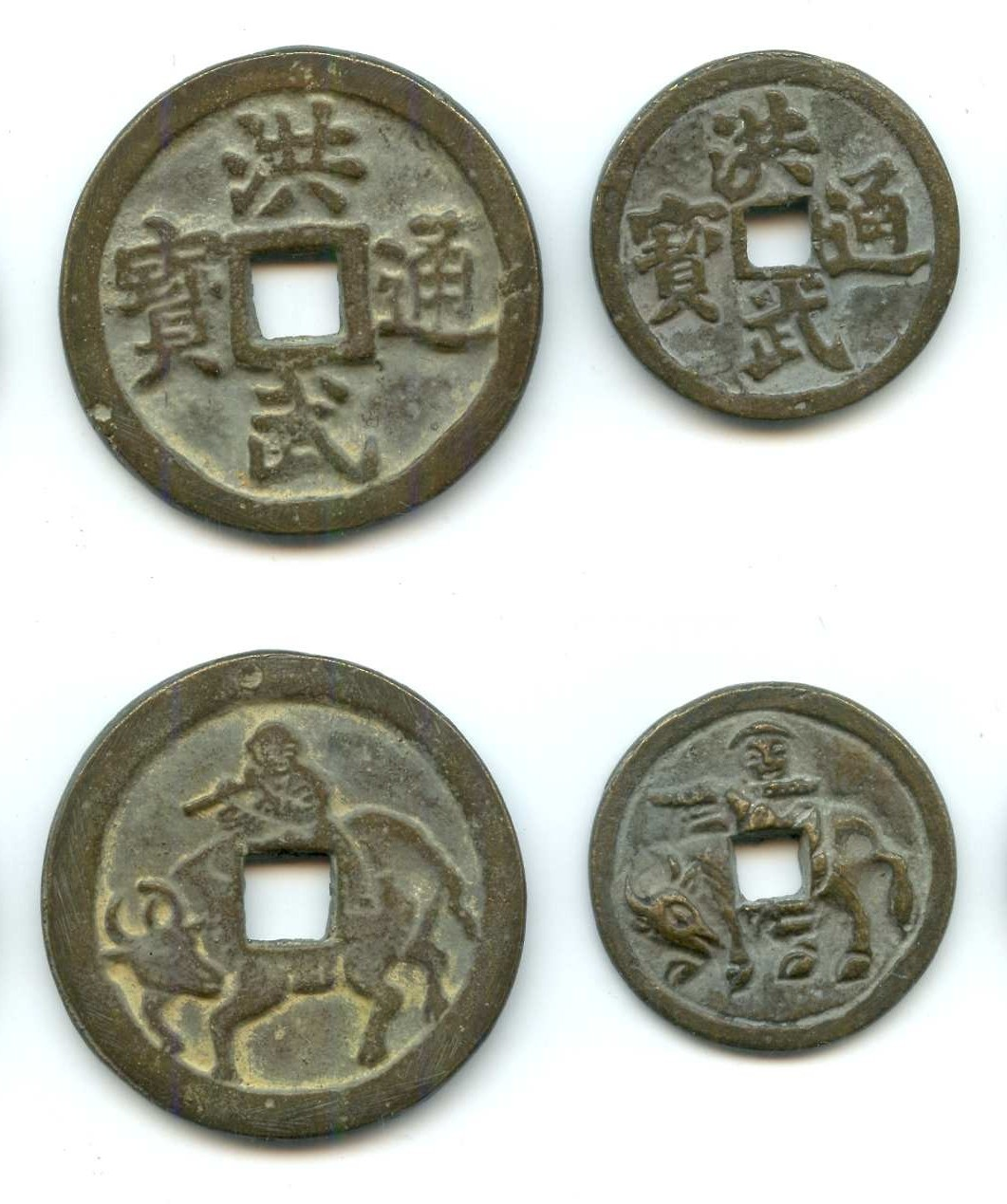
Hongwu Tongbao charms depicting a young boy playing the flute.

Usually these Hongwu Tongbao charms and amulets are a lot bigger than actual Hongwu Tongbao cash coins for example being 69 millimeters in diameter. However many of these charms and amulets need to be big because they depict very complex scenes of symbolism on their reverse sides. For example, a large Hongwu Tongbao charm may feature a lamb and an ox on its left side symbolising how Zhu Yuanzhang was born into a very poor family of peasants, a Buddhist monk seated on a lotus throne above the square center hole symbolising how he lived in a Buddhist monastery in his youth, next to this Buddhist monk are other Buddhist symbols such as "auspicious clouds" (祥雲) and a bodhi tree, which was the tree under which Gautama Buddha claimed to have found spiritual enlightenment. Another symbol included on this coin charm is a horse located right of the square center hole which symbolises the Mongols whose culture is strongly associated with the horse, the Mongol Yuan dynasty was overthrown by a rebellion of which Zhu Yuanzhang was a part. Another example of a Hongwu Tongbao charm with a size of 43 millimeters in diameter and weighs 29.2 grams depicts a less detailed scene where the reverse features a little boy playing a flute riding either an ox or a water buffalo, in this case the young boy represents Zhu Yuanzhang (or Emperor Taizu) in his youth while the flute he is playing is a symbol associated with a care free life while it is also both a Buddhist and a Taoist symbol. In Taoism the flute is associated with the immortal Lan Caihe while in Buddhism it is used in meditation which alludes to Zhu Yuanzhang's life in a Buddhist monastery. Meanwhile, not all larger Hongwu Tongbao charms feature more complex scenery as there is an example which only features an ox or water buffalo on the reverse alluding to the humble beginnings of the first Ming dynasty emperor.

== See also ==
- Economy of the Ming dynasty
- List of Chinese cash coins by inscription
