= Yongle Tongbao =

Chinese cash coin, minted 1408–1424

Yongle Tongbao 永樂通寶
- Ming dynasty (Note: Imitations of the Yongle Tongbao were cast throughout the Far East, most commonly in Japan and Vietnam.)
- Value: 1 wén
- Composition: 63–90% copper (Cu), 10–25% lead (Pb), 6–9% tin (Sn), and 0.04–0.18% zinc (Zn). Silver (Note: Silver Yongle Tongbao cash coins are known to exist but are extremely rare.)
- Years of minting: 1408–1424

Obverse
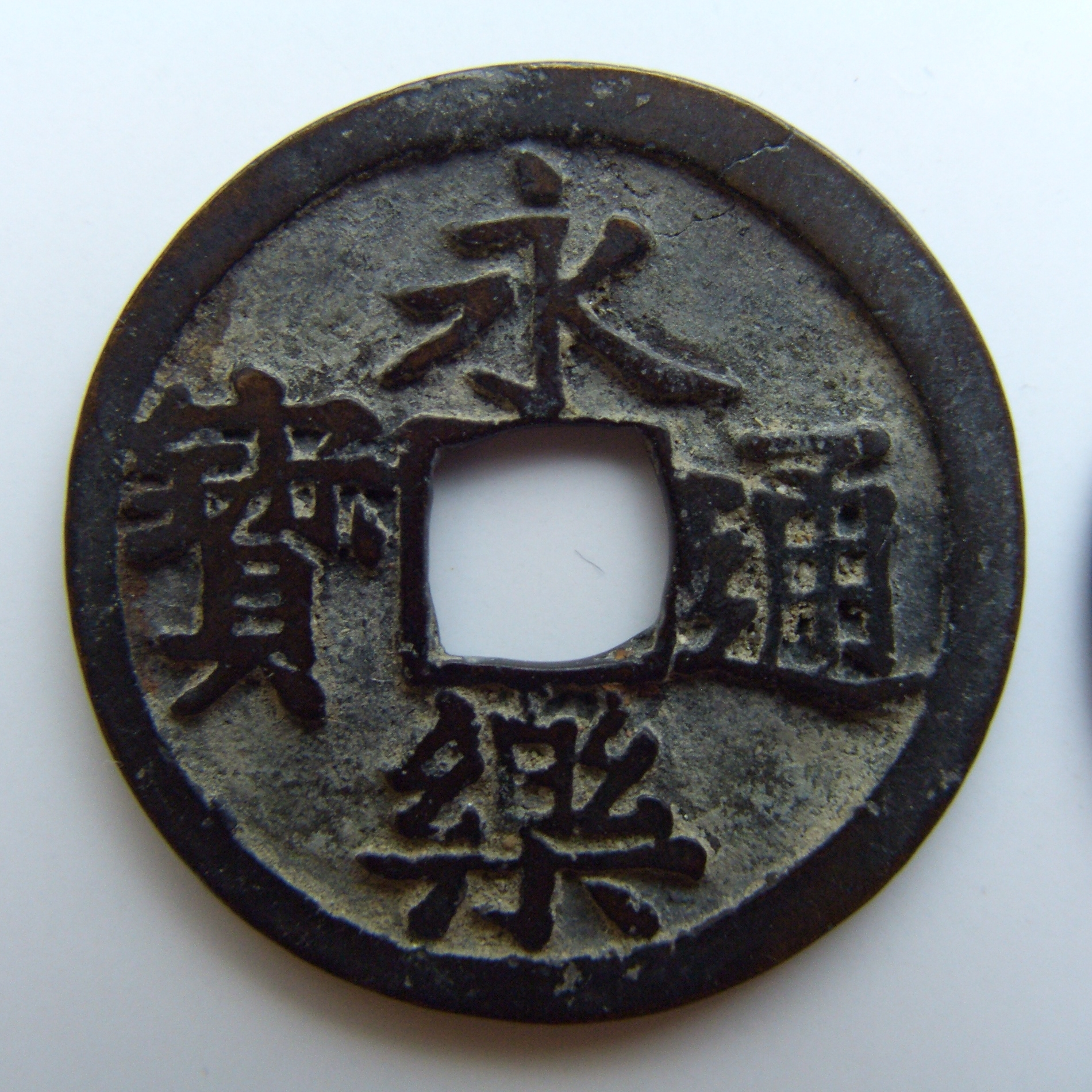
- Design: Yongle Tongbao (永樂通寶)

Reverse
- Design: Usually blank, but inscriptions may be used.

The Yongle Tongbao (traditional Chinese: 永樂通寳; simplified Chinese: 永乐通宝; pinyin: yǒnglè tōng bǎo, Japanese: 永楽通宝 (Eiraku Tsūhō); Vietnamese: Vĩnh Lạc Thông Bảo) was a Ming dynasty era Chinese cash coin produced under the reign of the Yongle Emperor. As the Ming dynasty did not produce copper coinage at the time since it predominantly used silver coins and paper money as the main currency, the records vary on when the Yongle Emperor ordered its creation between 1408 and 1410, this was done as the production of traditional cash-style coinage had earlier ceased in 1393. The Yongle Tongbao cash coins were notably not manufactured for the internal Chinese market where silver coinage and paper money would continue to dominate, but were in fact produced to help stimulate international trade as Chinese cash coins were used as a common form of currency throughout South, Southeast, and East Asia.

As Yongle Tongbao cash coins were primarily used only for foreign trade, it is extremely uncommon for Yongle Tongbao coins to be found in archaeological digs within China's borders. In fact, while very few coin hoards of Ming dynasty coins in China ever contain any Yongle Tongbao coins, comparatively Yongle Tongbao coins are dug up in large quantities in countries like India, Sri Lanka, Malaysia, Singapore, Indonesia, Thailand, Vietnam, South Korea and Japan, these coin hoards often weigh tens of tons. Outside of Asia Yongle Tongbao cash coins have also been found in places like Africa and Yukon.

In Japan, Eiraku Tsūhō (the Japanese pronunciation of Yongle Tongbao) cash coins became a very common design and many private and government mints produced copies of the coin. The design of an Eiraku Tsūhō coin was also used on the flag of Oda Nobunaga.

== In China ==
After the Yongle Emperor had ordered their production, the Yongle Tongbao cash coins started being produced in the mints of Beijing, Nanjing, and Fujian as well as the provincial mints of Zhejiang and Guangdong. However, as these coins were primarily manufactured for foreign trade and to be carried by envoys of the Chinese court they generally did not circulate within China itself as silver coinage and banknotes would continue to remain the dominant media of exchange. Under subsequent rulers coinage could continue to only be sparsely produced.

== In Japan ==
From 1587 Japan started exporting goods to China and received Chinese copper-alloy cash coins in return for payment, around this time the Japanese stopped minting their own coins and started relying heavily on Chinese cash coins as the internal demand for copper coinage increased. The Eiraku Tsūhō coin in Japan is known as a toraisen (渡来銭, "imported money"), and other cash coins with Ming dynasty era inscriptions also started circulating in Japan. As the imports of Chinese cash coins did not fulfill the demand the Japanese market had, many Japanese mints started casting reproductions of these toraisen which were known as shichūsen (私鋳銭, "privately minted money"), and shichūsen of inferior quality were known as bitasen (鐚銭) or money made from bad metal. These coins with Ming dynasty inscriptions remained in circulation in Japan until they were officially prohibited by the Tokugawa shogunate in 1608. Despite this however, Bitasen continued to circulate within Japan, but from 1670 the Eiraku Tsūhō was completely prohibited from circulation and depreciated in favour of the government produced Kan'ei Tsūhō cash coins.

=== Association with Oda Nobunaga ===
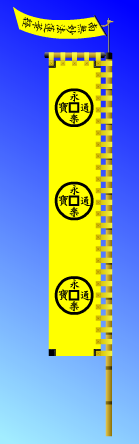
The flag (Nobori) of Oda Nobunaga displaying Chinese Eiraku Tsūhō coins.

On the 5th month of the year Eiroku 3 (永禄三年, or 1560 in the Gregorian calendar), daimyō Oda Nobunaga was preparing for the Battle of Okehazama and while he had an army of forty thousand men, he could only gather around two and a half thousand soldiers for this decisive battle. Oda Nobunaga then went to pray for a victorious military campaign at the nearby Atsuta-jingū, he asked the Gods to show him a sign that his prayers would be answered and while looking at a handful of Eiraku Tsūhō cash coins decided to throw them in the air. When they fell back on the ground they all landed with heads up, he took this as a sign that the Gods would bless him and informed his men that they shall be victorious as they Gods favoured them. After winning the battle he used the Eiraku Tsūhō as a motif for his nobori (a type of flag or banner) and then he had these Eiraku Tsūhō coins inlayed on the tsuba of the sword which he carried during the battle. After Oda Nobunaga's forces were victorious his retainer Hayashi Hidesada said that the Gods must have really spoken through these coins, to which Nobunaga replied by saying the Zen Buddhist proverb "I only know that I'm okay with what I got" (吾唯足知, ware tada taru o shiru) and presented to him an Eiraku Tsūhō coin of which both the obverse and reverse sides were heads. Family crests with this proverb written around a square hole resembling a cash coin are not uncommon among military families. Another possibility as to why Oda Nobunaga used Eiraku Tsūhō cash coins as a motif on his nobori was because Eiraku Tsūhō were originally all imported from Ming China during the Muromachi period and spread throughout Japan as the de facto currency, speculation has it that Nobunaga tried to emulate this by having Eiraku Tsūhō as his emblem meaning that his power too shall spread throughout Japan.

The tsuba Oda Nobunaga was carrying during his military campaigns which had the Eiraku Tsūhō inlayed into it was nicknamed the "invincibility tsuba" (まけずの鍔) as he had won all battles he had fought while carrying that tsuba. The Eiraku Tsūhō are divided on this tsuba with 6 being on the omote and 7 of them are displayed on the ura side. This tsuba was declared to be a Japanese national treasure in 1920.

== Influence on Ryukyuan coinage ==
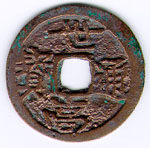
A Sekō Tsūhō (世高通寳) cash coin manufactured by using an altered Yongle Tongbao cash coin as a mother coin.

From 1461 the Ryukyu Kingdom under the reign of King Shō Toku started minting Sekō Tsūhō (世高通寳) cash coins based on the Yongle Tongbao, these coins were manufactured by using circulating Yongle Tongbao coins as mother coins and carving the characters Sekō (世高) out of the Yongle inscription on the top and bottom of the coin, this made the Sekou appear rounded while the Tsūhō (通寳) remained very angular, as copper shrinks during the cooling part of the manufacturing process these Sekō Tsūhō tend to be diminutive in size. Like regular Yongle Tongbao cash coins it is not uncommon for Ryukyuan cash coins from this period to also be found in coin hoards in countries like Indonesia.

== Yongle Tongbao cash coins in Kenya ==
Yongle Tongbao cash coins produced by the Ming dynasty have been unearthed in the East African country of Kenya, in 2010 a team of Kenyan and Chinese archeologists uncovered a Yongle Tongbao cash coin in the village of Mambrui which is just north of Malindi, this coin and other objects of Chinese origin in the area were taken as evidence of how far Zheng He's expedition reached as it is likely that this coin was brought to the island through the ventures of this Ming dynasty era Chinese explorer, this was seen as these researchers as proof that Zheng He also visited the area which is known today as Kenya. In the year 2013 during a joint expedition to Manda Island the researchers Chapurukha Kusimba of the Field Museum of Natural History and Sloan Williams from the University of Illinois at Chicago found a Yongle Tongbao coin there, this coin was also attributed as being likely brought there during Zheng He's expedition.

== Sources ==
- Hartill, David (September 22, 2005). Cast Chinese Coins. Trafford, United Kingdom: Trafford Publishing. ISBN 978-1412054669.
