= List of Chinese cash coins by inscription =

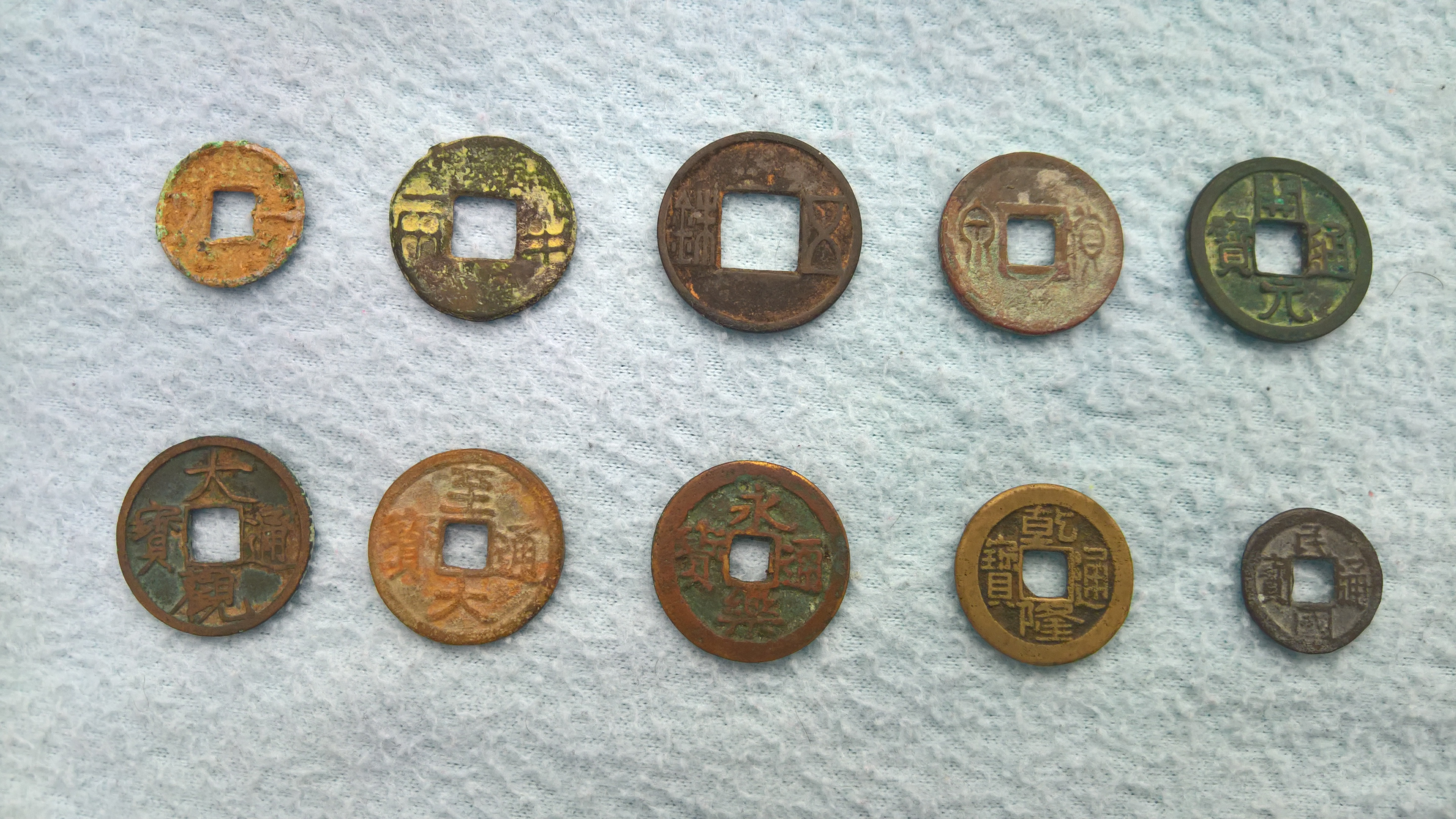
Chinese cash coins from every major dynasty in Chinese history and the Republic of China.

Chinese cash coins were first produced during the Warring States period, and they became standardised as the Ban Liang (半兩) coinage during the Qin dynasty which followed. Over the years, cash coins have had many different inscriptions, and the Wu Zhu (五銖) inscription, which first appeared under the Han dynasty, became the most commonly used inscription and was often used by succeeding dynasties for 700 years until the introduction of the Kaiyuan Tongbao (開元通寳) during the Tang dynasty. This was also the first time regular script was used as all earlier cash coins exclusively used seal script. During the Song dynasty a large number of different inscriptions was used, and several different styles of Chinese calligraphy were used, even on coins with the same inscriptions produced during the same period. These cash coins are known as matched coins (對錢). This was originally pioneered by the Southern Tang.

During the Yuan dynasty, largely deprecated copper coinage was abandoned in favour of paper money. This trend continued under the Ming dynasty. Cash coins only contained the era names of the emperor during the Ming dynasty. Due to a naming taboo the term "Yuanbao" (元寶) was phased out from cash coin inscriptions as the founder of the Ming dynasty, Zhu Yuanzhang had the word "Yuan" (元) in his name.

The trend of exclusively using the era names on currencies continued during the Qing dynasty, and all cash coins issued during this period were written in regular script.

Below is a list of obverse inscriptions that were used on Chinese cash coins organized by period and/or dynasty.

== Warring States ==
During the Warring states period, the first precursors of the Chinese cash coins started to appear. These early round coins (圜錢, huánqián) circulated alongside the knife and spade money. As most of these early round coins had round holes, the first "true" cash coins were the Yi Hua (一化) produced by the State of Yan. Apart from two small and presumably late coins from the State of Qin, coins from the spade money area have a round hole and refer to the jin and liang units. Those from the knife money area have a square hole and are denominated in hua.

=== Round hole, no rims, reverses plain and flat ===
List of early round coins produced between 350 BC and 220 BC:

| Inscription | Traditional Chinese | Hanyu pinyin | Meaning | Alternative reading(s) | Image |
|---|---|---|---|---|---|
| Gong | 共 | gòng | A city in the state of Liang | None | |
| Gong Tun Chi Jin | 共屯赤金 | gòng tún chì jīn | "Gong pure copper" | 共純赤金 (Gong Chun Chi Jin) | |
| Gong Ban Jin | 共半釿 | gòng bàn jīn | "Gong, half jin" | None | |
| Yuan (Note: A version of this coin exists with the inscription reversed.) | 垣 | yuán | A city in the state of Liang | None | |
| Gu | 古 | gǔ | "Old" | None | |
| An Zang | 安臧 | ān zāng | A city in the state of Zhou | None | |
| Qi Yuan Yi Jin | 桼垣一釿 | qī yuán yì jīn | "Qiyuan, one Jin", State of Liang | 長垣一釿 (Chang Yuan Yi Jin) 桼圜一釿 (Qi Yuan Yi Jin) | |
| Qi Yuan Yi Jin | 桼睘一釿 | qī yuán yì jīn | "Qiyuan, one Jin", State of Liang | 長垣一釿 (Chang Yuan Yi Jin) 桼圜一釿 (Qi Yuan Yi Jin) | |
| Xiang Yin (Note: A version of this coin exists with the inscription reversed.) | 襄陰 | xiāng yīn | A city in the state of Liang | 濟陰 (Ji Yin) 畢陰 (Bi Yin) | |
| Li Shi | 離石 | lí shí | A city in the state of Zhao | None | |
| Feng Ping | 封坪 | fēng píng | Unknown | 陰坪 (Yin Ping) 武坪 (Wu Ping) | |
| Hou Jin | 侯釿 | hóu jīn | "Hou, (one) Jin" | 𥎦釿 (Hou Jin) | |
| Lin | 焛 | lìn | A city in the state of Zhao | 藺 / 閵 (Lin) | |
| Wu'an | 武安 | wǔ ān | "Martial peace" | None | |
| Pishi | 皮氏 | pí shì | | None | |
| Pingbei | 平備 | píng bèi | "Perfect peace" | None | |
| Xi Zhou | 西周 | xī zhōu | State of Western Zhou | None | |
| Dong Zhou | 東周 | dōng zhōu | State of Eastern Zhou | None | |
| Ban Yuan | 半睘 | bàn qióng | "Half Coin" (Note: "Yuan Fa" (圜法) was a contemporary term for early round coinage.) | None | |

=== State of Yan ===
List of early round coins produced by the State of Yan between 300 BC and 220 BC:

| Inscription | Traditional Chinese | Hanyu pinyin | Alternative reading(s) | Image |
|---|---|---|---|---|
| Yi Hua (Note: As this was the first coin with a square hole this could be considered to be the first "true" Chinese cash coin. This inscription was formerly read as "Yi Dao" (一刀, "one knife"). A version exists where the inscription is reversed, and one where the character "吉" (jí, "auspicious") is on its reverse side.) | 一化 | yī huà | 一刀 (Yi Dao) | |
| Ming Hua | 明化 | míng huà | 明刀 (Ming Dao) 匽化 (Yan Hua) | |
| Ming Si | 明四 | míng sì | 匽四 (Yan Si) | |

=== State of Qi ===
List of early round coins produced by the State of Qi between 300 BC and 220 BC:

| Inscription | Traditional Chinese | Hanyu pinyin | Alternative reading(s) | Image |
|---|---|---|---|---|
| Yi Hua | 益化 | yì huà | 賹化 (Ai Hua) | |
| Yi Si Hua | 益四化 | yì sì huà | 賹四化 (Ai Si Hua) | |
| Yi Liu Hua (Note: The "Liu" (六) was formerly read as "Bao" (寶, "treasure").) | 益六化 | yì liù huà | 賹六化 (Ai Liu Hua) | |

=== State of Qin ===
List of early round coins produced by the State of Qin between 250 BC and 220 BC:

| Inscription | Traditional Chinese | Hanyu pinyin | Meaning | Image |
|---|---|---|---|---|
| Zhu Zhong Yi Liang Shi Er | 珠重一兩十二 | zhū zhòng yī liǎng shí èr | "Weight of 1 Liang and 12 times 1 Zhu" | |
| Zhu Zhong Yi Liang Shi Si | 珠重一兩十四 | zhū zhòng yī liǎng shí sì | "Weight of 1 Liang and 14 times 1 Zhu" | |
| Chang'an | 長安 | cháng'ān | Said to have been cast by Zhao Chengjiao, Lord of Chang'an. | |
| Wenxin | 文信 | wén xìn | Said to have been cast by Lü Buwei, the Marquis of Wenxin. | |
| Liang Zi | 兩甾 (Note: Could alternatively be read as "兩錙".) | liǎng zī | "Two Zi" (12 Zhu) | |
| Ban Liang | 半兩 | bàn liǎng | "Half tael" | |

== Qin dynasty ==
During the Qin dynasty production of the Ban Liang cash coins continued and its weight was standardised.

| Inscription | Traditional Chinese | Hanyu pinyin | Literal translation | Years of production | Emperors | Image |
|---|---|---|---|---|---|---|
| Ban Liang | 半兩 | bàn liǎng | "Half tael" | 221 BC–206 BC | Qin Shi Huang; Qin Er Shi | |

== Western Han dynasty ==
Under the Western Han dynasty the Ban Liang cash coins of the earlier Qin dynasty were retained until a series of monetary reforms replaced them first with the San Zhu and then the Wu Zhu, the latter would be continued to be manufactured for around 700 years.

| Inscription | Traditional Chinese | Hanyu pinyin | Literal translation | Years of production | Image |
|---|---|---|---|---|---|
| Ban Liang | 半兩 | bàn liǎng | "Half tael" | 206 BC–119 BC | |
| San Zhu | 三銖 | sān zhū | "Three Zhu" | 119 BC–118 BC (Note: Some historical records state that San Zhu cash coins were produced between 140 BC until 136 BC.) | |
| Wu Zhu | 五銖 | wǔ zhū | "Five Zhu" | 118 BC–9 AD | |

== Xin dynasty ==
After Wang Mang usurped the throne he instituted various monetary reforms, in AD 9 he retained the Wu Zhu cash coins but introduced two new types of Knife money, between AD 9 and 10 he introduced an impossibly complex system involving tortoise shell, cowries, gold, silver, six round copper coins, and a reintroduction of the spade money in ten denominations. In AD 14, all these tokens were abolished, and replaced by another type of spade coin and new round coins.

List of cash coins issued by the Xin dynasty:

| Inscription | Traditional Chinese | Hanyu pinyin | Literal translation | Years of production | Emperor | Image |
|---|---|---|---|---|---|---|
The Six Round Coins (series 9–14)
| Xiao Quan Zhi Yi | 小泉直一 | xiǎoquán zhí yī | "Small Coin, Value One" | 9–14 | Wang Mang | |
| Yao Quan Yi Shi | 么泉一十 | yǎo quán yīshí | "Baby Coin, Ten" | 9–14 | Wang Mang | |
| You Quan Er Shi | 幼泉二十 | yòu quán èrshí | "Juvenile Coin, Twenty" | 9–14 | Wang Mang | |
| Zhong Quan San Shi | 中泉三十 | zhōng quán sānshí | "Middle Coin, Thirty" | 9–14 | Wang Mang | |
| Zhuang Quan Si Shi | 壯泉四十 | zhuàng quán sìshí | "Adult Coin, Forty" | 9–14 | Wang Mang | |
| Da Quan Wu Shi | 大泉五十 | dàquán wǔshí | "Large coin with a nominal value of fifty (Wu Zhu cash coins)" | 9–14 | Wang Mang | |
Later issues
| Huo Quan | 貨泉 | huòquán | "Wealth/Money Coin" | 14–23 | Wang Mang | |
| Bu Quan | 布泉 | bù quán | "Spade Coin" | 14–23 | Wang Mang | |

== Chengjia ==
The rebel Gongsun Shu cast iron cash coins based on the Wu Zhu's of the Western Han dynasty in his rebel state of Chengjia in present-day Sichuan:

| Inscription | Traditional Chinese | Hanyu Pinyin | Emperor | Approximate years of mintage | Image |
|---|---|---|---|---|---|
| Wu Zhu | 五銖 | wǔ zhū | Gongsun Shu | 25–36 | |

== Eastern Han dynasty ==
The Eastern Han dynasty only cast Wu Zhu (五銖) cash coins.

| Inscription | Traditional Chinese | Hanyu Pinyin | Image |
|---|---|---|---|
| Wu Zhu | 五銖 | wǔ zhū | |

== Kingdom of Khotan ==
List of cash coins produced by the Kingdom of Khotan:

| Inscription | Traditional Chinese | Hanyu Pinyin | Approximate years of production | King | Illustration (from A. Stein) | Image |
|---|---|---|---|---|---|---|
| Yu Fang | 于方 | yú fāng | 129–130 | Fang Qian | | |

== Three Kingdoms ==
List of Chinese cash coins issued during Three Kingdoms period:

| Inscription | Traditional Chinese | Hanyu pinyin | Literal translation | Approximate years of production | King | Image |
|---|---|---|---|---|---|---|
Cao Wei (222–265)
| Wu Zhu | 五銖 | wǔ zhū | "Five Zhu" | 227–265 | All (except for Cao Pi) | |
Shu Han (221–265)
| Zhi Bai Wu Zhu | 直百五銖 | zhí bǎi wǔ zhū | "Value One Hundred Wu Zhu" | 214 | Liu Bei | |
| Zhi Bai | 直百 | zhí bǎi | "Value One Hundred" | 214 | Liu Bei | |
| Tai Ping Bai Qian | 太平百錢 | tàipíng bǎi qián | "Taiping One Hundred Cash" | Unknown | Liu Bei | |
| Tai Ping Bai Jin (Note: A "goose eye" variant of the Tai Ping Bai Qian where the "Qian" (錢) is abbreviated as "Jin" (金).) | 太平百金 | tàipíng bǎi jīn | "Taiping One Hundred Cash" | Unknown | Liu Bei | |
| Zhi Yi | 直一 | zhí yī | "Value One" | Unknown | Liu Bei | |
| Ding Ping Yi Bai | 定平一百 | dìngpíng yībǎi | "Ding Ping One Hundred" | Unknown | Liu Bei | |
| Wu Zhu | 五銖 | wǔ zhū | "Five Zhu" | Unknown | Liu Bei | |
Eastern Wu (222–280)
| Da Quan Wu Bai | 大泉五百 | dàquán wǔbǎi | "Large Coin, Five Hundred" | 236 | Sun Quan | |
| Da Quan Dang Qian | 大泉當千 | dàquán dāng qiān | "Large Coin Worth a Thousand" | 238 | Sun Quan | |
| Da Quan Er Qian | 大泉二千 | dàquán èrqiān | "Large Coin, Two Thousand" | Unknown | Sun Quan | |
| Da Quan Wu Qian | 大泉五千 | dàquán wǔqiān | "Large Coin, Five Thousand" | Unknown | Sun Quan | |

== Kingdom of Kucha ==
List of cash coins produced by the Kingdom of Kucha:

| Inscription (Obverse) | Inscription (Reverse) | Approximate years of production | Differentiating features | Image |
|---|---|---|---|---|
| Blank | | 265–589 | These have a rim around the square centre hole on one side while the other side is rimless, they tend to thin on the outside while they're thick on the inside. | |
| Blank | | 265–589 | Similar to the first type but these cash coins have no inner rim. | |
| Blank | | 265–589 | These cash coins are completely without rim but are square in shape and have a square centre hole, they tend to be very thin. | |
| Blank | | 265–589 | These cash coins are irregularly shaped, diminutive in size, thin, and are cast of poor workmanship. Some are merely five millimeters in diameter and weigh as little as 0.2 grams. | |
| 五銖 (Wu Zhu) | An undeciphered Kuśiññe language inscription. | Unknown | These are the only known cash coins produced by Kucha with an inscription. | |

== Jin dynasty and Sixteen Kingdoms ==
List of Chinese cash coins produced during the Jin dynasty and Sixteen Kingdoms period:

| Inscription | Traditional Chinese | Hanyu pinyin | Literal translation | Approximate years of production | Monarch | Image |
|---|---|---|---|---|---|---|
Jin dynasty (266–420)
| Wu Zhu | 五銖 | wǔ zhū | "Five Zhu" | Unknown | Unknown | |
Former Liang Kingdom (301–376)
| Liang Zao Xin Quan | 涼造新泉 | liáng zào xīnquán | "Liang Made New Coin" | 317–376 | King Zhang Gui | |
| Wu Zhu | 五銖 | wǔ zhū | "Five Zhu" | Unknown | King Zhang Gui (Note: This is presumed based on archeological evidence.) | |
Later Zhao Kingdom (319–352)
| Feng Huo | 豐貨 | fēng huò | "The Coin of Abundance" | 319 | Shi Le | |
Cheng Han Kingdom (303–347)
| Han Xing | 漢興 | hàn xìng | "the period title of [Han Xing]" (Note: This is the first recorded use of a period title on a Chinese cash coin.) | 337–343 | Li Shou | |
Xia Kingdom (407–431)
| Tai Xia Zhen Xing | 太夏眞興 | tài xià zhēnxìng | "Great Xia, Zhenxing [period]" | 419–424 | Helian Bobo | |

== Northern and Southern dynasties ==
List of cash coins produced by the Northern and Southern dynasties:

| Inscription | Traditional Chinese | Hanyu Pinyin | Literal translation | Years of production | Emperor (South / North) | Image |
|---|---|---|---|---|---|---|
Southern dynasties
Song dynasty (420–479)
| Si Zhu | 四銖 | sì zhū | "Four Zhu" | 430 | Emperor Wen | |
| Xiao Jian (obverse); Si Zhu (reverse) | 孝建 (obverse) 四銖 (reverse) | xiào jiàn (obverse) sì zhū (reverse) | "Xiaojian period" (obverse) "Four Zhu" (reverse) | 454–467 | Emperor Xiaowu | |
| Xiao Jian | 孝建 | xiào jiàn | "Xiaojian period" | 454–467 | Emperor Xiaowu | |
| Jing He | 景和 | jǐng hé | "[Jing He period title]" | 465 | Emperor Fei | |
| Yong Guang | 永光 | yǒng guāng | "[Yong Guang period title]" | 465 | Emperor Fei | |
| Liang Zhu | 兩銖 | liǎng zhū | "Two Zhu", "A pair of Zhu's" | 465 | Emperor Fei | |
Southern Qi Dynasty (479–502)
| Wu Zhu | 五銖 | wǔ zhū | "Five Zhu" | 490 | Emperor Wu | |
Liang dynasty (502–556)
| Wu Zhu | 五銖 | wǔ zhū | "Five Zhu" | 502–556 | All | |
| Taiqing Fengle | 太清豐樂 | tài qīng fēng lè | "Tai Qing, Prosperous and Happy" | 547–549 | Emperor Wu | |
Chen dynasty (557–589)
| Wu Zhu | 五銖 | wǔ zhū | "Five Zhu" | 560–566 | Emperor Wen | |
| Taihuo Liuzhu | 太貨六銖 | tài huò liù zhū | "The Large Coin Six Zhu" | 579 | Emperor Xuan | |
| Liu Zhu (Note: Only one specimen of this cash coin is known to exist.) | 六銖 | liù zhū | "Six Zhu" | 579 | Emperor Xuan | |
Northern dynasties
Northern Wei dynasty (386–534)
| Taihe Wuzhu | 太和五銖 | tài hé wǔ zhū | "Taihe [period] Wu Zhu" | 495 | Emperor Xiaowen | |
| Wu Zhu | 五銖 | wǔ zhū | "Five Zhu" | 510 | Emperor Xuanwu | |
| Yongan Wuzhu | 永安五銖 | yǒng'ān wǔ zhū | "Yong An [period] Wu Zhu" | 529–543 | Emperor Xiaozhuang | |
Western Wei dynasty (535–557)
| Wu Zhu | 五銖 | wǔ zhū | "Five Zhu" | 546 | Emperor Wen | |
Northern Qi dynasty (550–77)
| Chang Ping Wu Zhu | 常平五銖 | chángpíng wǔ zhū | "The Constant and Regular Wu Zhu" | 553 | Emperor Wenxuan | |
Northern Zhou dynasty (557–581)
| Bu Quan | 布泉 | bù quán | "Spade Coin" | 561 | Emperor Wu | |
| Wuxing Dabu | 五行大布 | wǔháng dà bù | "The Large Coin of the Five Elements [metal, wood, water, fire, and earth]" | 574 | Emperor Wu | |
| Yongtong Wanguo | 永通萬國 | yǒng tōng wànguó | "Everlasting Circulation in Ten Thousand Kingdoms" | 579 | Emperor Xuan | |

== Sui dynasty ==
The Sui dynasty only cast Wu Zhu (五銖) cash coins.

| Inscription | Traditional Chinese | Hanyu Pinyin | Image |
|---|---|---|---|
| Wu Zhu | 五銖 | wǔ zhū | |

== Tang dynasty ==
List of cash coins issued by the Tang dynasty:

| Inscription | Traditional Chinese | Hanyu Pinyin | Years of production | Emperor | Image |
|---|---|---|---|---|---|
| Kaiyuan Tongbao | 開元通寶 | kāiyuán tōng bǎo | 621–846 | Various | |
| Qianfeng Quanbao | 乾封泉寶 | qián fēng quán bǎo | 666 | Gaozong | |
| Qianyuan Zhongbao | 乾元重寶 | qián yuán zhòng bǎo | 758–762 | Suzong | |

=== Local issues ===
List of local issue cash coins of the Tang dynasty:

| Inscription | Traditional Chinese | Hanyu Pinyin | Approximate years of production | Place of mintage | Emperor | Image |
|---|---|---|---|---|---|---|
| Dali Yuanbao | 大曆元寶 | dà lì yuánbǎo | 766–779 | Kucha area, Protectorate General to Pacify the West | Daizong | |
| Da | 大 | dà | 766–779 | Kucha area, Protectorate General to Pacify the West | Daizong | |
| Yuan | 元 | yuán | 766–779 | Kucha area, Protectorate General to Pacify the West | Daizong | |
| Jianzhong Tongbao | 建中通寶 | jiàn zhōng tōng bǎo | 780–783 | Kucha area, Protectorate General to Pacify the West | Dezong | |
| Zhong | 中 | zhōng | 780–783 | Kucha area, Protectorate General to Pacify the West | Dezong | |
| Xiantong Xuanbao | 咸通玄寶 | xián tōng xuán bǎo | 860–874 | Guiyang Inspectorate | Yizong | |
| Gaochang Jili | 高昌吉利 | Gāochāng jí lì | 860–874 | Gaochang | Yizong | |

== Yan dynasty ==
List of cash coins issued by the Great Yan dynasty during the An Lushan Rebellion:

| Inscription | Traditional Chinese | Hanyu Pinyin | Years of production | Emperor | Image |
|---|---|---|---|---|---|
| Deyi Yuanbao | 得壹元寶 | de yī yuánbǎo | 758 | Shi Siming | |
| Shuntian Yuanbao | 順天元寶 | shùn tiān yuánbǎo | 759–761 | Shi Siming | |

== Uyghur Khaganate ==
The Uyghur Khaganate manufactured a cash coin with an Old Uyghur inscription under the reign of Boquq Khagan. A later cash coin is known to have been cast by the Uyghurs but it is not known when it was manufactured.

| Inscription (obverse) | Inscription (reverse) | Approximate years of production | Khagan | Image |
|---|---|---|---|---|
| Köl bilgä Tängri Boquq Uiğur qağan | Il tutmiš yarliğinga | 795–808 | Boquq Khagan | |
| Iduq yarliq yurisun | | Unknown | Unknown | |

== Five Dynasties and Ten Kingdoms ==
=== Later Liang dynasty ===
List of cash coins produced by the Later Liang dynasty (907–923):

| Inscription | Traditional Chinese | Hanyu Pinyin | Years of production | Emperor | Image |
|---|---|---|---|---|---|
| Kaiping Tongbao | 開平通寶 | kāipíng tōng bǎo | 907 | Zhu Wen | |

=== Later Tang dynasty ===
List of cash coins produced by the Later Tang dynasty (923–936):

| Inscription | Traditional Chinese | Hanyu Pinyin | Years of production | Emperor | Image |
|---|---|---|---|---|---|
| Tiancheng Yuanbao | 天成元寶 | tiānchéng yuánbǎo | 926–929 | Ming | |

=== Later Jin dynasty (936–947) ===
List of cash coins produced by the Later Jin dynasty (936–947):

| Inscription | Traditional Chinese | Hanyu Pinyin | Years of production | Emperor | Image |
|---|---|---|---|---|---|
| Tianfu Yuanbao | 天福元寶 | tiānfú yuánbǎo | 938 | Gao Zong | |

=== Later Han dynasty ===
List of cash coins produced by the Later Han dynasty (948–951):

| Inscription | Traditional Chinese | Hanyu Pinyin | Years of production | Emperor | Image |
|---|---|---|---|---|---|
| Hanyuan Tongbao | 漢元通寶 | hàn yuán tōng bǎo | 948 | Gao Zu | |

=== Later Zhou dynasty ===
List of cash coins produced by the Later Zhou dynasty (951–960):

| Inscription | Traditional Chinese | Hanyu Pinyin | Years of production | Emperor | Image |
|---|---|---|---|---|---|
| Zhouyuan Tongbao | 周元通寶 | zhōuyuán tōng bǎo | 955–960 | Shi Zong | |

=== Former Shu ===
List of cash coins attributed to the Former Shu Kingdom (907–925):

| Inscription | Traditional Chinese | Hanyu Pinyin | Years of production | King | Image |
|---|---|---|---|---|---|
| Yongping Yuanbao | 永平元寶 | yǒng píng yuánbǎo | 911–915 | Wang Jian | |
| Tongzheng Yuanbao | 通正元寶 | tōng zhèng yuánbǎo | 916 | Wang Jian | |
| Tianhan Yuanbao | 天漢元寶 | tiānhàn yuánbǎo | 917 | Wang Jian | |
| Guangtian Yuanbao | 光天元寶 | guāng tiān yuánbǎo | 918 | Wang Jian | |
| Qiande Yuanbao | 乾德元寶 | qián dé yuánbǎo | 919–924 | Wang Zongyan | |
| Xiankang Yuanbao | 咸康元寶 | xián kāng yuánbǎo | 925 | Wang Zongyan | |

=== Kingdom of Min ===
List of cash coins attributed to the Kingdom of Min (909–945):

| Inscription | Traditional Chinese | Hanyu Pinyin | Differentiating features and notes | Years of production | Monarch | Image |
|---|---|---|---|---|---|---|
| Kaiyuan Tongbao | 開元通寶 | kāiyuán tōng bǎo | A small lead Kai Yuan coin was minted in Ninghua County of Dingzhou Prefecture in Fujian Province, where deposits of lead had been discovered. The lead coins circulated together with copper coins. | 916 | Wang Shenzhi | |
| Kaiyuan Tongbao | 開元通寶 | kāiyuán tōng bǎo | These cash coins have a large dot above on the reverse side. They are made of iron and the same coin cast in bronze is extremely rare. | 922 | Wang Shenzhi | |
| Kaiyuan Tongbao | 開元通寶 | kāiyuán tōng bǎo | These cash coins have the character Min (Chinese: 閩; pinyin: mǐn) on the reverse. They are from the Fujian region and made of lead. | | Wang Shenzhi | |
| Kaiyuan Tongbao | 開元通寶 | kāiyuán tōng bǎo | These cash coins have the character Fu (Chinese: 福; pinyin: fú) on the reverse in reference to Fuzhou. They are made of lead. | | Wang Shenzhi | |
| Yonglong Tongbao | 永隆通寶 | yǒnglóng tōng bǎo | These iron cash coins have the character Min (Chinese: 閩; pinyin: mǐn) on the reverse and comes from the Fujian region. There is a crescent below. One of these large Yonglong Tongbao coins was worth 10 small coins and 100 lead coins. A string of 500 of these poorly made Min iron coins were popularly called a kao ("a manacle"). | 942 | Wang Yanxi | |
| Tiande Tongbao | 天德通寶 | tiān dé tōng bǎo | These cash coins are made of iron. | 944 | Wang Yanzheng | |

=== Kingdom of Chu ===
List of cash coins attributed to the Kingdom of Chu (907–951):

| Inscription | Traditional Chinese | Hanyu Pinyin | Differentiating features and notes | Years of production | Monarch | Image |
|---|---|---|---|---|---|---|
| Tiance Fubao | 天策府寶 | tiān cè fǔ bǎo | These cash coins are made of iron. | 911 | Supreme Commander Ma Yin | |
| Qianfeng Quanbao | 乾封泉寶 | qiān fēng quán bǎo | These cash coins are made of iron. According to the histories, because there was much lead and iron in Hunan, Ma Yin took the advice of his minister Gao Yu to cast lead and iron coins at Changsha in 925. Extremely rare bronze specimens are also known. | 925 | King Wumu of Chu | |
| Qianyuan Zhongbao | 乾元重寶 | qiān yuán zhòng bǎo | These cash coins bear an inscription that is also found on Tang coins. This small lead coin is thought to have been issued by the Chu kingdom. Similar bronze coins are sometimes attributed to Ma Yin, but could be funerary items. | Unknown | Ma Yin | |

=== Later Shu ===
Cash coins produced by the Later Shu (926–965) include:

| Inscription | Traditional Chinese | Hanyu Pinyin | Differentiating features | Years of production | Monarch | Image |
|---|---|---|---|---|---|---|
| Dashu Tongbao | 大蜀通寶 | dà shǔ tōng bǎo | These cash coins are attributed to Meng Zhixiang when he became Emperor Gao Zu of Shu in Chengdu in 934. He died three months later. Despite its rarity, some say this coin continued to be cast by his son, Meng Chang, until 937. | 934(–937) | Gao Zu | |
| Guangzheng Tongbao | 廣政通寶 | guǎng zhèng tōng bǎo | These cash coins are either made of bronze or iron. The bronze coins were cast by Meng Chang from the beginning of this period, 938. In 956, iron coins began to be cast to cover additional military expenses. | 938–963 | Meng Chang | |

=== Southern Tang Kingdom ===
Cash coins manufactured by the Southern Tang Kingdom (937–975) include:

| Inscription | Traditional Chinese | Hanyu Pinyin | Differentiating features | Years of production | Monarch | Image |
|---|---|---|---|---|---|---|
| Daqi Tongbao | 大齊通寶 | dà qí tōng bǎo | These cash coins were said to have been cast by the Prince of Qi or by the founder of the Southern Tang with the original name of the Tang kingdom. Only two specimens were known, and these have now disappeared. | 937 | Xu Zhigao | |
| Baoda Yuanbao | 保大元寶 | bǎo dà yuán bǎo | This cash coin has on its reverse the character Tian (天) above. They are made of iron and date between. There is also an extremely rare bronze example of this coin. | 943–957 | Yuan Zong | |
| Yongtong Quanhuo | 永通泉貨 | yǒng tōng quán huò | | 959–964 | Yuan Zong | |
| Tangguo Tongbao | 唐國通寶 | tang guó tōng bǎo | The inscriptions of these cash coins could be written in seal, li, and regular script. | 959 | Yuan Zong | |
| Datang Tongbao | 大唐通寶 | dà táng tōng bǎo | These coins are all written in li script. | 959 | Yuan Zong | |
| Kaiyuan Tongbao | 開元通寶 | kāiyuán tōng bǎo | These versions of the Kaiyuan Tongbao are written in li script and have broader rims. | 961 | Li Yu | |

=== Southern Han Kingdom ===
The cash coins produced by the Southern Han dynasty were:

| Inscription | Traditional Chinese | Hanyu Pinyin | Differentiating features | Years of production | Monarch | Image |
|---|---|---|---|---|---|---|
| Kaiping Yuanbao | 開平元寶 | kāi píng yuán bǎo | These cash coins were made from lead. | 907–910 | Liu Yin | |
| Qianheng Tongbao | 乾亨通寶 | gān hēng tōng bǎo | | 917–942 | Lie Zu | |
| Qianheng Zhongbao | 乾亨重寶 | gān hēng zhòng bǎo | These cash coins were made from bronze and lead. | 917–942 | Lie Zu | |

=== Crude lead coins ===
Crude lead cash coins attributed to the Southern Han/Chu area (900–971):

| Inscription | Traditional Chinese | Hanyu Pinyin | Differentiating features | Image |
|---|---|---|---|---|
| Kaiyuan Tongbao | 開元通寶 | kāiyuán tōng bǎo | These cash coins are based on Tang Dynasty coins. They have a local style with numerous reverse inscriptions which are apparently series numbers. | |
| Kai "da" Tongbao | 開大通寶 | kāidà tōng bǎo | "Da" is an error for yuan due to poor workmanship. | |
| Kaiyuan Zhongbao | 開元重寶 | kāiyuán zhòng bǎo | Unlike Tang zhongbao coins, these are quite small. | |

There is a very great variety of such coins; some have crescents on the reverse. The Kai character sometimes looks like yong (Chinese: 永; pinyin: yǒng). Characters and legends often reversed because the incompetent workmen had not mastered the art of engraving in negative to make the moulds. Some specimens have meaningless characters.

Cash coins with hybrid inscriptions from this same area:

| Inscription | Traditional Chinese | Hanyu Pinyin | Image |
|---|---|---|---|
| Wu Wu | 五五 | wǔ wǔ | |
| Wu Wu Wu | 五五五 | wǔ wǔ wǔ | |
| Wu Wu Wu Wu | 五五五五 | wǔ wǔ wǔ wǔ | |
| Wu Zhu | 五朱 | wǔ zhū | |
| Kai Yuan Wu Wu | 開元五五 | kāiyuán wǔ wǔ | |

These cash coins are typical of the hybrid inscriptions formed by combinations of inappropriate characters. They also have series numbers on the reverse. Note that the radical "釒" is missing from this Wu Zhu (五朱) coin. One variant of the Wu Wu (五五) coin has the Xin dynasty inscription Huo Quan (貨泉) on its reverse.

=== You Zhou Autonomous Region ===
The following cash coins were produced in the You Zhou Autonomous Region (割據幽州), which enjoyed virtual independence from the rest of the empire, between 900 and 914:

| Inscription | Traditional Chinese | Hanyu Pinyin | Differentiating features | Image |
|---|---|---|---|---|
| Yong An Yi Shi | 永安一十 | yǒng'ān yīshí | | |
| Yong An Yi Bai | 永安一百 | yǒng'ān yībǎi | | |
| Yong An Wu Bai | 永安五百 | yǒng'ān wǔbǎi | | |
| Yong An Yi Qian | 永安一千 | yǒng'ān yīqiān | These cash coins are found in either bronze or iron. | |
| Wu Zhu | 五銖 | wǔ zhū | These Wu Zhu cash coins are made from iron. | |
| Huo Bu (obverse); San Bai (reverse) | 貨布 (Obverse) 三百 (reverse) | huò bù (obverse) sānbǎi (reverse) | | |
| Shuntian Yuanbao | 順天元寶 | shùn tiān yuánbǎo | Are made from iron. These poorly made coins are imitations of coins of previous regimes and are attributed to the You Zhou. | |

== Liao dynasty ==
Liao dynasty coins (like some contemporary Song dynasty coins) can be read top-right-bottom-left (clockwise), but unlike the Song's coinage never appeared top-bottom-right-left. Liao dynasty era cash coins have appeared in both Chinese and Khitan scripts, but the latter can more accurately be described as a type of Chinese numismatic charms as they weren't meant for circulation.

List of cash coins produced by the Khitan-led Liao dynasty:

| Inscription | Traditional Chinese | Simplified Chinese | Years of minting | Emperor | Image |
|---|---|---|---|---|---|
| Tian Zan Tong Bao | 天贊通寶 | 天赞通宝 | ?–927 | Taizong | |
| Tian Xian Tong Bao | 天顯通寶 | 天显通宝 | 927–937 | Taizong | |
| Hui Tong Tong Bao | 會同通寶 | 会同通宝 | 938–947 | Taizong | |
| Tian Lu Tong Bao | 天祿通寶 | 天禄通宝 | 947–951 | Shizong | |
| Ying Li Tong Bao | 應曆通寶 | 应历通宝 | 951–969 | Muzong | |
| Bao Ning Tong Bao | 保寧通寶 | 保宁通宝 | 969–982 | Jingzong | |
| Tong He Yuan Bao | 統和元寶 | 統和元宝 | 983–1011 | Shengzong | |
| Chong Xi Tong Bao | 重熙通寶 | 重熙通宝 | 1032–1055 | Xingzong | |
| Qing Ning Tong Bao | 清寧通寶 | 清宁通宝 | 1055–1064 | Daozong | |
| Xian Yong Tong Bao | 咸雍通寶 | 咸雍通宝 | 1065–1074 | Daozong | |
| Da Kang Tong Bao | 大康通寶 | 大康通宝 | 1074–1084 | Daozong | |
| Da Kang Yuan Bao | 大康元寶 | 大康元宝 | 1074–1084 | Daozong | |
| Da An Yuan Bao | 大安元寶 | 大安元宝 | 1085–1094 | Daozong | |
| Shou Chang Yuan Bao | 壽昌元寶 | 寿昌元宝 | 1095–1101 | Daozong | |
| Qian Tong Yuan Bao | 乾統元寶 | 乾统元宝 | 1101–1110 | Tianzuo | |
| Tian Qing Yuan Bao | 天慶元寶 | 天庆元宝 | 1111–1120 | Tianzuo | |

Because the Khitan people minted very few coins, and not every emperor minted coins with era names, forged Khitan coins have appeared since the Qing Dynasty. At the beginning of the 21st century, a large number of forged ancient Liao coins appeared in mainland China, many of which didn't exist historically.

=== With Khitan inscriptions ===
Coins with Khitan large scripts:

| Inscription (Khitan) | Inscription (Mandarin) | Traditional Chinese | Simplified Chinese | Years of casting | Emperor | Image |
|---|---|---|---|---|---|---|
| | Tian Chao Wan Shun | 天朝萬順 | 天朝万顺 | ？ | ？ | |

== Northern Song dynasty ==
The cash coins of the Song dynasty are notable in the aspect that many cash coins of the same era that use the same inscription and have the same nominal value come in multiple Chinese calligraphic fonts. Many Emperors of the Song dynasty personally wrote the calligraphy to be inscribed on the cash coin. There are generally three scripts used on Song dynasty era cash coins which include Regular script, Seal script, and Running hand script/Grass script. The reading order of Song dynasty era cash coins exist in top-bottom-right-left and top-right-bottom-left orders.

List of cash coins produced by the Northern Song dynasty:

| Inscription | Traditional Chinese | Simplified Chinese | Scripts | Period minted | Emperor | Image |
|---|---|---|---|---|---|---|
| Song Yuan Tong Bao | 宋元通寶 | 宋元通宝 | Regular script | 960–976 | Taizu | |
| Tai Ping Tong Bao | 太平通寶 | 太平通宝 | Regular script | 976–989 | Taizong | |
| Chun Hua Yuan Bao | 淳化元寶 | 淳化元宝 | Regular script, Seal script, Running script | 990–994 | Taizong | |
| Zhi Dao Yuan Bao | 至道元寶 | 至道元宝 | Regular script, Grass script, Running script | 995–997 | Taizong | |
| Xian Ping Yuan Bao | 咸平元寶 | 咸平元宝 | Regular script | 998–1003 | Zhenzong | |
| Jing De Yuan Bao | 景德元寶 | 景德元宝 | Regular script | 1004–1007 | Zhenzong | |
| Xiang Fu Tong Bao | 祥符通寶 | 祥符通宝 | Regular script, Running script | 1008–1016 | Zhenzong | |
| Xiang Fu Yuan Bao | 祥符元寶 | 祥符元宝 | Regular script | 1008–1016 | Zhenzong | |
| Tian Xi Tong Bao | 天禧通寶 | 天禧通宝 | Regular script | 1017–1022 | Zhenzong | |
| Tian Sheng Yuan Bao | 天聖元寶 | 天圣元宝 | Regular script, Seal script | 1023–1031 | Renzong | |
| Ming Dao Yuan Bao | 明道元寶 | 明道元宝 | Regular script, Seal script | 1032–1033 | Renzong | |
| Jing You Yuan Bao | 景祐元寶 | 景祐元宝 | Regular script, Seal script | 1034–1038 | Renzong | |
| Huang Song Tong Bao | 皇宋通寶 | 皇宋通宝 | Regular script, Seal script, Nine-fold seal script (Note: A rare variety of this cash coin has its inscription written in Nine-fold seal script (九叠篆) which was a style of Chinese calligraphy used during this period that was usually only reserved for official Song dynasty seals.) | 1039–1054 | Renzong | |
| Kang Ding Yuan Bao | 康定元寶 | 康定元宝 | Regular script | 1040 | Renzong | |
| Qing Li Zhong Bao | 慶歷重寶 | 庆历重宝 | Regular script | 1041–1048 | Renzong | |
| Zhi he Tong Bao | 至和通寶 | 至和通宝 | Regular script, Seal script | 1054–1055 | Renzong | |
| Zhi he Yuan Bao | 至和元寶 | 至和元宝 | Regular script, Seal script | 1054–1055 | Renzong | |
| Zhi he Zhong Bao | 至和重寶 | 至和重宝 | Regular script, Seal script | 1054–1055 | Renzong | |
| Jia You Tong Bao | 嘉祐通寶 | 嘉祐通宝 | Regular script, Seal script | 1056–1063 | Renzong | |
| Jia You Yuan Bao | 嘉祐元寶 | 嘉祐元宝 | Regular script, Seal script | 1056–1063 | Renzong | |
| Zhi Ping Tong Bao | 治平通寶 | 治平通宝 | Regular script, Seal script | 1064–1067 | Yingzong | |
| Zhi Ping Yuan Bao | 治平元寶 | 治平元宝 | Regular script, Seal script | 1064–1067 | Yingzong | |
| Xi Ning Tong Bao | 熙寧通寶 | 熙宁通宝 | Regular script, Seal script | 1068–1077 | Shenzong | |
| Xi Ning Yuan Bao | 熙寧元寶 | 熙宁元宝 | Regular script, Seal script | 1068–1077 | Shenzong | |
| Xi Ning Zhong Bao | 熙寧重寶 | 熙宁重宝 | Regular script, Seal script | 1071–1077 | Shenzong | |
| Yuan Feng Tong Bao | 元豐通寶 | 元丰通宝 | Regular script, Seal script, Running script | 1078–1085 | Shenzong | |
| Yuan You Tong Bao | 元祐通寶 | 元祐通宝 | Seal script, Running script | 1086–1094 | Zhezong | |
| Shao Sheng Tong Bao | 紹聖通寶 | 绍圣通宝 | Regular script, Seal script, Running script | 1094–1098 | Zhezong | |
| Shao Sheng Yuan Bao | 紹聖元寶 | 绍圣元宝 | Regular script, Seal script, Running script | 1094–1098 | Zhezong | |
| Yuan Fu Tong Bao | 元符通寶 | 元符通宝 | Regular script, Seal script, Running script | 1098–1100 | Zhezong | |
| Jian Guo Tong Bao (Note: These cash coins were cast to celebrate the period title of Jian Zhing Jing Guo which was considered too long to use as an inscription and these cash coins were not made for general circulation. The Jian Guo Tong Bao is notably made from white copper.) | 建國通寶 | 建国通宝 | Regular script, Seal script | 1101 | Huizong | |
| Sheng Song Tong Bao | 聖宋通寶 | 圣宋通宝 | Regular script, Seal script | 1101–1106 | Huizong | |
| Sheng Song Yuan Bao | 聖宋元寶 | 圣宋元宝 | Clerical script, Seal script, Running script | 1101–1106 | Huizong | |
| Chong Ning Tong Bao | 崇寧通寶 | 崇宁通宝 | Regular script | 1102–1106 | Huizong | |
| Chong Ning Yuan Bao | 崇寧元寶 | 崇宁元宝 | Regular script | 1102–1106 | Huizong | |
| Chong Ning Zhong Bao | 崇寧重寶 | 崇宁重宝 | Regular script | 1102–1106 | Huizong | |
| Da Guan Tong Bao | 大觀通寶 | 大观通宝 | Regular script | 1107–1110 | Huizong | |
| Zheng He Tong Bao | 政和通寶 | 政和通宝 | Regular script, Seal script | 1111–1117 | Huizong | |
| Zheng He Zhong Bao | 政和重寶 | 政和重宝 | Regular script | 1111–1117 | Huizong | |
| Chong He Tong Bao | 重和通寶 | 重和通宝 | Regular script, Seal script | 1118–1119 | Huizong | |
| Xuan He Tong Bao | 宣和通寶 | 宣和通宝 | Regular script, Seal script | 1119–1125 | Huizong | |
| Xuan He Yuan Bao | 宣和元寶 | 宣和元宝 | Regular script, Seal script | 1119–1125 | Huizong | |
| Jing Kang Tong Bao | 靖康通寶 | 靖康通宝 | Regular script, Seal script | 1126–1127 | Qinzong | |
| Jing Kang Yuan Bao | 靖康元寶 | 靖康元宝 | Regular script, Seal script | 1126–1127 | Qinzong | |

=== Sui ethnic minority during the Northern Song dynasty ===
In 2004, a coin produced by the Sui people of Guizhou was discovered dating to the Northern Song dynasty, most likely produced between 1008 and 1016. This coin had the inscription dà zhōng xiáng fú (大中祥符) on one side and the word "wealth" written in Sui script on the other side. As this is the only known coin produced by the Sui people, it established that they don't have a numismatic tradition like the Han Chinese have.

| Inscription | Traditional Chinese | Years of production | Emperor | Image |
|---|---|---|---|---|
| Dazhong Xiangfu | 大中祥符 | 1008–1016 | Zhenzong | |

== Great Shu Kingdom ==
In the year 993 a group of tea farmers and landless tenant farmers under the leadership if Wang Xiaobo rebelled against the Northern Song dynasty, in the year 994 after Wang Xiaobo died his brother-in-law Li Shun proclaimed himself to be the "King of the Great Shu Kingdom" (大蜀王, dà shǔ wáng) in Chengdu after he captured the city ("Shu" being an archaic name for Sichuan). Li Shun was defeated and killed in the year 995. During his period he used the reign era and produced cash coins with this "Yingyun" (應運, yìng yùn) inscription while after his death his former subordinates used the Yinggan (應感) inscription.

List of cash coins issued by the Great Shu Kingdom:

| Inscription | Traditional Chinese | Simplified Chinese | King | Image |
|---|---|---|---|---|
| Yingyun Tongbao | 應運通寶 | 应运通宝 | Li Shun (李顺) | |
| Yingyun Yuanbao | 應運元寶 | 应运元宝 | Li Shun (李顺) | |
| Yinggan Tongbao | 應感通寶 | 应感通宝 | None | |

== Southern Song dynasty ==
Under the Southern Song dynasty it became customary to add the date of issue on the reverse of the coin and as copper shortages and phenomena known as "currency famines" (錢荒) plagued the land both iron cash coins and paper money (in the form of Jiaozi, Guanzi, and Huizi notes) became more common leading to a decline of the production of bronze coinage.

List of cash coins produced by the Southern Song dynasty:

| Inscription | Traditional Chinese | Simplified Chinese | Scripts | Period minted | Emperor | Image |
|---|---|---|---|---|---|---|
| Jianyan Tongbao | 建炎通寶 | 建炎通宝 | Regular script, Seal script | 1127–1130 | Gaozong | |
| Jianyan Yuanbao | 建炎元寶 | 建炎元宝 | Regular script, Seal script | 1127–1130 | Gaozong | |
| Jianyan Zhongbao | 建炎重寶 | 建炎重宝 | Seal script | 1127–1130 | Gaozong | |
| Shaoxing Tongbao | 紹興通寶 | 绍兴通宝 | Regular script, Seal script | 1131–1162 | Gaozong | |
| Shaoxing Yuanbao | 紹興元寶 | 绍兴元宝 | Regular script | 1131–1162 | Gaozong | |
| Longxing Tongbao | 隆興通寶 | 隆兴通宝 | Regular script, Seal script | 1163–1164 | Xiaozong | |
| Longxing Yuanbao | 隆興元寶 | 隆兴元宝 | Regular script, Seal script | 1163–1164 | Xiaozong | |
| Qiandao Tongbao | 乾道通寶 | 干道通宝 | Regular script | 1165–1173 | Xiaozong | |
| Qiandao Yuanbao | 乾道元寶 | 干道元宝 | Regular script | 1165–1173 | Xiaozong | |
| Chunxi Tongbao | 淳熙通寶 | 淳熙通宝 | Regular script | 1174–1189 | Xiaozong | |
| Chunxi Yuanbao | 淳熙元寶 | 淳熙元宝 | Regular script, Seal script | 1174–1189 | Xiaozong | |
| Shaoxi Tongbao | 紹熙通寶 | 绍熙通宝 | Regular script, Seal script | 1190–1194 | Guangzong | |
| Shaoxi Yuanbao | 紹熙元寶 | 绍熙元宝 | Regular script, Seal script | 1190–1194 | Guangzong | |
| Qingyuan Tongbao | 慶元通寶 | 庆元通宝 | Regular script | 1195–1200 | Ningzong | |
| Qingyuan Yuanbao | 慶元元寶 | 庆元元宝 | Regular script | 1195–1200 | Ningzong | |
| Jiatai Tongbao | 嘉泰通寶 | 嘉泰通宝 | Regular script | 1201–1204 | Ningzong | |
| Jiatai Yuanbao | 嘉泰元寶 | 嘉泰元宝 | Regular script | 1201–1204 | Ningzong | |
| Kaixi Tongbao | 開禧通寶 | 开禧通宝 | Regular script | 1205–1207 | Ningzong | |
| Kaixi Yuanbao | 開禧元寶 | 开禧元宝 | Regular script | 1205–1207 | Ningzong | |
| Shengsong Yuanbao | 聖宋元寶 | 圣宋元宝 | Regular script | 1210 | Ningzong | |
| Shengsong Zhongbao | 聖宋重寶 | 圣宋重宝 | Regular script | 1210 | Ningzong | |
| Jiading Tongbao | 嘉定通寶 | 嘉定通宝 | Regular script | 1208–1224 | Ningzong | |
| Jiading Zhongbao | 嘉定重寶 | 嘉定重宝 | Regular script, seal script | 1208–1224 | Ningzong | |
| Jiading Yuanbao | 嘉定元寶 | 嘉定元宝 | Regular script | 1208–1224 | Ningzong | |
| Jiading Dabao | 嘉定大寶 | 嘉定大宝 | Regular script | 1208–1224 | Ningzong | |
| Jiading Chongbao | 嘉定崇寶 | 嘉定崇宝 | Regular script | 1208–1224 | Ningzong | |
| Jiading Quanbao | 嘉定全寶 | 嘉定全宝 | Regular script | 1208–1224 | Ningzong | |
| Jiading Yongbao | 嘉定永寶 | 嘉定永宝 | Regular script | 1208–1224 | Ningzong | |
| Jiading Zhenbao | 嘉定真寶 | 嘉定真宝 | Regular script | 1208–1224 | Ningzong | |
| Jiading Xinbao | 嘉定新寶 | 嘉定新宝 | Regular script | 1208–1224 | Ningzong | |
| Jiading Anbao | 嘉定安寶 | 嘉定安宝 | Regular script | 1208–1224 | Ningzong | |
| Jiading Longbao | 嘉定隆寶 | 嘉定隆宝 | Regular script | 1208–1224 | Ningzong | |
| Jiading Quanbao | 嘉定泉寶 | 嘉定泉宝 | Regular script | 1208–1224 | Ningzong | |
| Jiading Zhengbao | 嘉定正寶 | 嘉定正宝 | Regular script | 1208–1224 | Ningzong | |
| Jiading Hongbao | 嘉定洪寶 | 嘉定洪宝 | Regular script | 1208–1224 | Ningzong | |
| Jiading Wanbao | 嘉定万寶 | 嘉定万宝 | Regular script | 1208–1224 | Ningzong | |
| Jiading Zhibao | 嘉定之寶 | 嘉定之宝 | Regular script | 1208–1224 | Ningzong | |
| Jiading Zhenbao | 嘉定珍寶 | 嘉定珍宝 | Regular script | 1208–1224 | Ningzong | |
| Jiading Xingbao | 嘉定興寶 | 嘉定兴宝 | Regular script | 1208–1224 | Ningzong | |
| Jiading Yongbao | 嘉定用寶 | 嘉定用宝 | Regular script | 1208–1224 | Ningzong | |
| Jiading Zhibao | 嘉定至寶 | 嘉定至宝 | Regular script | 1208–1224 | Ningzong | |
| Jiading Fengbao | 嘉定封寶 | 嘉定封宝 | Regular script | 1208–1224 | Ningzong | |
| Baoqing Yuanbao | 寶慶元寶 | 宝庆元宝 | Regular script | 1225–1227 | Lizong | |
| Dasong Tongbao | 大宋通寶 | 大宋通宝 | Regular script | 1225 | Lizong | |
| Dasong Yuanbao | 大宋元寶 | 大宋元宝 | Regular script | 1225–1227 | Lizong | |
| Shaoding Tongbao | 紹定通寶 | 绍定通宝 | Regular script | 1228–1233 | Lizong | |
| Shaoding Yuanbao | 紹定元寶 | 绍定元宝 | Regular script | 1228–1233 | Lizong | |
| Duanping Tongbao | 端平通寶 | 端平通宝 | Regular script | 1234–1236 | Lizong | |
| Duanping Yuanbao | 端平元寶 | 端平元宝 | Regular script | 1234–1236 | Lizong | |
| Duanping Zhongbao | 端平重寶 | 端平重宝 | Regular script | 1234–1236 | Lizong | |
| Jiaxi Tongbao | 嘉熙通寶 | 嘉熙通宝 | Regular script | 1237–1240 | Lizong | |
| Jiaxi Zhongbao | 嘉熙重寶 | 嘉熙重宝 | Regular script | 1237–1240 | Lizong | |
| Chunyou Tongbao | 淳祐通寶 | 淳祐通宝 | Regular script | 1241–1252 | Lizong | |
| Chunyou Yuanbao | 淳祐元寶 | 淳祐元宝 | Regular script | 1241–1252 | Lizong | |
| Huangsong Yuanbao | 皇宋元寶 | 皇宋元宝 | Regular script | 1253–1258 | Lizong | |
| Kaiqing Tongbao | 開慶通寶 | 开庆通宝 | Regular script | 1259 | Lizong | |
| Jingding Yuanbao | 景定元寶 | 景定元宝 | Regular script | 1260–1264 | Lizong | |
| Xianchun Yuanbao | 咸淳元寶 | 咸淳元宝 | Regular script | 1265–1274 | Duzong | |

The Southern Song dynasty General Liu Guangshi (劉光世) also cast special cash coins with the inscription "Zhaona Xinbao" (招納信寶) to recruit Jin soldiers and allow them to defect to the Song Army, however these weren't meant for circulation.

== Western Liao dynasty (Qara Khitai) ==
Kangguo Tongbao (康國通寳) on display at the National Museum of History in Taiwan.

In November 2008, October 2010, and February 2011 three specimens of cash coins produced by the Western Liao were unearthed in Kyrgyzstan, the first specimen of these cash coins were initially thought to bear the inscription "Jixing Yuanbao" (績興元寳) but after the second one was unearthed its inscription was better understood (Xuxing Yuanbao 續興元寳).

In February 2022, a coin with the inscription "Tianxi Yuanbao" (天喜元寶) was found at the Burana site in Kyrgyzstan, in the vicinity of the Qara Khitai capital of Balasagun. This has been identified as a Western Liao coin dating to the Tianxi era (1178–1218) of the last Western Liao emperor.

| Inscription | Traditional Chinese | Simplified Chinese | Hanyu Pinyin | Presumed years of production | Presumed Khan | Image |
|---|---|---|---|---|---|---|
| Xuxing Yuanbao | 續興元寳 | 续兴元宝 | xù xìng yuán bǎo | 1150–1164 | Yelü Yilie | |
| Tianxi Yuanbao | 天喜元寳 | 天喜元宝 | tiān xǐ yuán bǎo | 1177–1211 | Yelü Zhilugu | |

== Western Xia dynasty ==
The Tangut Western Xia dynasty produced both cash coins with Chinese and Tangut inscriptions. Despite issuing coins the economy of the Tangut Empire mostly relied on barter which is why Western Xia era coins today are rare.

=== With Tangut inscriptions ===
Coins with Tangut inscriptions: (Note: The transliterations are those from Tangutologist Li Fanwen, as opposed to David Hartill's usage "Lee Ndzen" and similar phonetics which are common in the numismatics community.)

| Inscription (Tangut) | Inscription (Mandarin) | Traditional Chinese | Simplified Chinese | Years of casting | Emperor | Image |
|---|---|---|---|---|---|---|
| śjɨj ljo ljɨ̣ dzjɨj (𗼃𗼕𘏨𘔭) | Fu Sheng Bao Qian | 福聖寶錢 | 福圣宝钱 | 1053–1056 | Yizong | |
| tha nej ljɨ̣ dzjɨj (𘜶𗵐𘏨𘔭) | Da An Bao Qian | 大安寶錢 | 大安宝钱 | 1074–1084 | Huizong | |
| tśhja bio̲ ljɨ̣ dzjɨj (𗣼𘝯𘏨𘔭) | Zhen Guan Bao Qian | 貞觀寶錢 | 贞观宝钱 | 1101–1113 | Chongzong | |
| tśhja mji̲ ljɨ̣ dzjɨj (𗣼𘇚𘏨𘔭) | Zheng De Bao Qian | 正德寶錢 | 正德宝钱 | 1127–1134 | Chongzong | |
| tshjwu ꞏwu ljɨ̣ dzjɨj (𘀗𘑨𘏨𘔭) | Qian You Bao Qian | 乾祐寶錢 | 乾祐宝钱 | 1170–1193 | Renzong | |
| ŋwər ljwu ljɨ̣ dzjɨj (𘓺𘅝𘏨𘔭) | Tian Qing Bao Qian | 天慶寶錢 | 天庆宝钱 | 1194–1206 | Huanzong | |

=== With Chinese inscriptions ===
| Inscription | Traditional Chinese | Simplified Chinese | Script | Years of casting | Emperor | Image |
|---|---|---|---|---|---|---|
| Da An Tong Bao | 大安通寶 | 大安通宝 | Clerical script | 1074–1084 | Huizong | |
| Yuan De Tong Bao | 元德通寶 | 元德通宝 | Clerical script | 1119–1126 | Chongzong | |
| Da De Tong Bao | 大德通寶 | 大德通宝 | Regular script | 1135–1139 | Chongzong | |
| Tian Sheng Yuan Bao | 天盛元寶 | 天盛元宝 | Regular script | 1149–1169 | Renzong | |
| Qian You Yuan Bao | 乾祐元寶 | 乾祐元宝 | Regular script, Semi-cursive script, Seal script | 1170–1193 | Renzong | |
| Tian Qing Yuan Bao | 天慶元寶 | 天庆元宝 | Regular script | 1194–1206 | Huanzong | |
| Huang Jian Yuan Bao | 皇建元寶 | 皇建元宝 | Regular script | 1210–1211 | Xiangzong | |
| Guang Ding Yuan Bao | 光定元寶 | 光定元宝 | Semi-cursive script, Seal script | 1211–1223 | Shenzong | |

== Jin dynasty (1115–1234) ==
Cash coins produced by the Jurchen-led Jin dynasty compared to earlier Liao dynasty coinage are both of higher quality, and quantity; this is because the Jurchens chose to model their coins more closely after the Song's both in production as superficially in its calligraphic style.

Cash coins issued by the Jurchens before 1110s:

| Obverse inscription (Romanisation) | Reverse | Notes | Image |
|---|---|---|---|
| 大金朝合 (Da Jin Chao He) | Blank | The title of "Da Chao Jin He" (大朝金合) exists in controversy. The attribution of this coins to the Mongols is doubtful as the name "大朝" was used by various countries that bordered China. This coin was first mentioned in the Record of Coins which was published around 1094. Peng Xinwei attributes this coin to the Liao dynasty. The text on the coin should be read clockwise as "Da Jin Chao He" (大金朝合), and the National Museum of China identified it as belonging to the early Jin Dynasty coins. | |

List of cash coins produced by the Jurchen-led Jin dynasty:

| Inscription | Traditional Chinese | Simplified Chinese | Scripts | Years of minting | Emperor | Image |
|---|---|---|---|---|---|---|
| Zheng Long Yuan Bao | 正隆元寶 | 正隆元宝 | Regular script | 1158–1161 | Wanyan Liang | |
| Da Ding Tong Bao | 大定通寶 | 大定通宝 | Regular script | 1178–1189 | Shizong | |
| Tai He Tong Bao | 泰和通寶 | 泰和通宝 | Regular script | 1204–1209 | Zhangzong | |
| Tai He Zhong Bao | 泰和重寶 | 泰和重宝 | Regular script, Seal script | 1204–1209 | Zhangzong | |
| Chong Qing Tong Bao | 崇慶通寶 | 崇庆通宝 | Regular script | 1212–1213 | Wanyan Yongji | |
| Chong Qing Yuan Bao | 崇慶元寶 | 崇庆元宝 | Regular script | 1212–1213 | Wanyan Yongji | |
| Zhi Ning Yuan Bao | 至寧元寶 | 至宁元宝 | Regular script | 1213 | Wanyan Yongji | |
| Zhen You Tong Bao | 貞祐通寶 | 贞祐通宝 | Regular script | 1213–1216 | Xuanzong | |
| Zhen You Yuan Bao | 貞祐元寶 | 贞祐元宝 | Regular script | 1213–1216 | Xuanzong | |

== Li Pobei ==
During a Jin invasion that occurred in November 1125, Li Pobei (李婆備) took advantage of this situation and rebelled against the Northern Song dynasty. He is known to have cast cash coins with the inscription "Taiping Tongbao" (太平通寶).

| Inscription | Traditional Chinese | Simplified Chinese | Denominations | Years of production | Leader | Image |
|---|---|---|---|---|---|---|
| Taiping Tongbao | 太平通寶 | 太平通宝 | 1 wén, 2 wén, 5 wén | 1127–1130 | Li Pobei | |

== Great Qi dynasty ==
In 1130 during the Jin–Song Wars the Jin dynasty had set up a second puppet state called “Da Qi” (after the failed first puppet state, Da Chu), this puppet state briefly produced its own coins until it was defeated by the Song in 1137.

Coins produced by the brief Jurchen vassal state include:

| Inscription | Traditional Chinese | Simplified Chinese | Script | Emperor | Image |
|---|---|---|---|---|---|
| Fu Chang Tong Bao | 阜昌通寶 | 阜昌通宝 | Regular script, Seal script | Liu Yu | |
| Fu Chang Yuan Bao | 阜昌元寶 | 阜昌元宝 | Regular script, Seal script | Liu Yu | |
| Fu Chang Zhong Bao | 阜昌重寶 | 阜昌重宝 | Regular script, Seal script | Liu Yu | |

== Mongol Empire (prior to the establishment of the Yuan dynasty) ==
Cash coins issued by the Mongols before 1230:

| Obverse inscription (Romanisation) | Reverse | Notes | Image |
|---|---|---|---|
| 大朝通寶 (Dachao Tongbao) | Unknown Arabic characters | These coins were possibly cast between 1206 and 1227 in Karakorum by Genghis Khan as "大朝" was a name the Mongols gave themselves. The coin is mostly found made from silver although copper variants exist. | |
| 支鈔半分 (Zhichao Banfen) | Blank | Zhichao Banfen (支鈔半分) could be translated as "Exchange for paper money half a fen [of silver]". The inscription could alternatively read Jiaochao Banfen (交鈔半分). | |

Cash coins issued by the Mongol Empire while it occupied Jin dynasty territory (circa 1230–1280):

| Obverse inscription (Romanisation) | Reverse | Notes | Image |
|---|---|---|---|
| 大觀通寶 (Daguan Tongbao) | Blank | This cash coins has rather broad rims. | |
| 大觀通寶 (Daguan Tongbao) | 中 (Zhong) | The "中" is written in seal script and is above the square center hole on the reverse. | |
| 大觀通寶 (Daguan Tongbao) | 半錢 (Ban Qian) | The reverse inscription indicates that this cash coin had a nominal value of half a qián of silver. | |
| 大觀通寶 (Daguan Tongbao) | Blank | This is a cash coin of diminutive size with the Chinese character "觀" written in an imperfect way. | |
| 大觀通寶 (Daguan Tongbao) | Dot pattern | The reverse of this coin is completely covered with dots. | |
| 大觀通寶 (Daguan Tongbao) | Blank | The inscription is written in a very barbarous manner. | |

== Yuan dynasty ==
During the Yuan dynasty, paper money such as the Jiaochao completely replaced copper coinage, during times of inflation Temple coins issued by Buddhist temples became the de facto currency. Under Külüg Khan a large number of cash coins were issued to pay for the state's expenditures but these got phased out in favour of paper currency, it wasn't until the reign of Toghon Temür that the Yuan dynasty attempted to produce cash coins at a large scale again.

List of cash coins issued by the Yuan dynasty: (Note: Chinese, and 'Phags-pa scripts would generally appear on the obverse of these coins, while Mongol script would appear on the reverse and would serve as a mint mark (and in one instance the Mongol 'Phags-pa, Uighur Chagatai, and Tangut scripts); Kublai Khan's Zhongtong Yuanbao (中統元寶) was the only coin that contained Seal script, all other Chinese inscriptions during the Mongol period were written in regular script)

| Inscription | Traditional Chinese | Script | Khagan (Mongolian name) | Emperor (Mandarin Chinese name) | Image |
|---|---|---|---|---|---|
| Zhongtong Yuanbao | 中統元寶 | Chinese script (Regular script and Seal script), Mongol script | Kublai Khan | Shìzǔ (世祖) | |
| Zhiyuan Tongbao | 至元通寶 | Chinese script, 'Phags-pa script | Kublai Khan | Shìzǔ (世祖) | |
| Yuanzhen Tongbao | 元貞通寶 | Chinese script, 'Phags-pa script | Temür Khan | Chéngzōng (成宗) | |
| Yuanzhen Yuanbao | 元貞元寶 | Chinese script, Mongol 'Phags-pa script | Temür Khan | Chéngzōng (成宗) | |
| Dade Tongbao | 大德通寶 | Chinese script, Mongol 'Phags-pa script | Temür Khan | Chéngzōng (成宗) | |
| Zhida Tongbao | 至大通寶 | Chinese script, Mongol 'Phags-pa script | Külüg Khan | Wǔzōng (武宗) | |
| Zhida Yuanbao | 至大元寶 | Chinese script | Külüg Khan | Wǔzōng (武宗) | |
| Dayuan Tongbao | 大元通寶 | Chinese script, Mongol 'Phags-pa script | Külüg Khan | Wǔzōng (武宗) | |
| Huangqing Yuanbao | 皇慶元寶 | Chinese script | Ayurbarwada Buyantu Khan | Rénzōng (仁宗) | |
| Yanyou Tongbao | 延祐通寶 | Chinese script | Ayurbarwada Buyantu Khan | Rénzōng (仁宗) | |
| Yanyou Yuanbao | 延祐元寶 | Chinese script | Ayurbarwada Buyantu Khan | Rénzōng (仁宗) | |
| Zhizhi Tongbao | 至治通寶 | Chinese script | Gegeen Khan | Yīngzōng (英宗) | |
| Zhizhi Yuanbao | 至治元寶 | Chinese script | Gegeen Khan | Yīngzōng (英宗) | |
| Taiding Tongbao | 泰定通寶 | Chinese script | Yesün Temür | Jìnzōng (晉宗) | |
| Taiding Yuanbao | 泰定元寶 | Chinese script | Yesün Temür | Jìnzōng (晉宗) | |
| Zhihe Yuanbao | 致和元寶 | Chinese script | Yesün Temür | Jìnzōng (晉宗) | |
| Tianli Yuanbao | 天曆元寶 | Chinese script | Jayaatu Khan Tugh Temür | Wénzōng (文宗) | |
| Zhishun Yuanbao | 至順元寶 | Chinese script | Jayaatu Khan Tugh Temür | Wénzōng (文宗) | |
| Yuantong Yuanbao | 元統元寶 | Chinese script | Toghon Temür | Huìzōng (惠宗) | |
| Zhiyuan Tongbao | 至元通寶 | Chinese script, Mongol 'Phags-pa script, Uighur Chagatai script, Tangut script | Toghon Temür | Huìzōng (惠宗) | |
| Zhiyuan Yuanbao | 至元元寶 | Chinese script | Toghon Temür | Huìzōng (惠宗) | |
| Muqing Tongbao | 穆清銅寶 | Chinese script | Toghon Temür | Huìzōng (惠宗) | |
| Zhizheng Tongbao | 至正通寶 | Chinese script, Mongol 'Phags-pa script | Toghon Temür | Huìzōng (惠宗) | |
| Zhizheng Zhibao | 至正之寶 | Chinese script | Toghon Temür | Huìzōng (惠宗) | |

== Rebels of the Yuan dynasty ==
During the Red Turban rebellion organised by the White Lotus society; many of its leaders proclaimed their own kingdoms and empires that ruled over different regions of China, the most successful of these was Zhu Yuanzhang's Ming dynasty which would unify China. Though the majority of these countries were short-lived some did produce their own coinage.

| Inscription | Traditional Chinese | Simplified Chinese | Denominations | Years of mintage | Monarch | Rebel faction | Image |
|---|---|---|---|---|---|---|---|
| Longfeng Tongbao | 龍鳳通寶 | 龙凤通宝 | 1文, 2文, 3文, 5文 | 1355–1366 | Han Lin’er (韓林兒) | Early Red Turban rebellion | |
| Tianyou Tongbao | 天祐通寶 | 天祐通宝 | 1文, 2文, 3文, 5文 | 1354–1357 | Zhang Shicheng (張士誠) | Kingdom of Great(er) Zhou (大周) | |
| Tianqi Tongbao | 天啟通寶 | 天启通宝 | 1文, 2文, 3文 | 1358 | Xu Shouhui (徐壽輝) | Tianwan (天完) | |
| Tianding Tongbao | 天定通寶 | 天定通宝 | 1文, 2文, 3文 | 1359–1360 | Xu Shouhui (徐壽輝) | Tianwan (天完) | |
| Dayi Tongbao | 大義通寶 | 大义通宝 | 1文, 2文, 3文 | 1360–1361 | Chen Youliang (陳友諒) | Kingdom of Dahan (大漢) | |

== Ming dynasty ==
Under the Ming dynasty the policy of predominantly using paper money (such as the Da Ming Baochao banknotes) which was started under the Mongols would continue until 1505 when Spanish dollars and other silver coins became the dominant currency. Native production of cash coins had ceased between 1375 and 1376, from 1387 until 1379, from 1393 (as paper money superseded cast coinage completely) until 1433, and finally from 1435 until 1503.

Yongle Tongbao cash coins were mostly cast for foreign trade.

From the Ming dynasty onwards only period titles were used for coin inscriptions and these period titles would (usually) remain constant throughout the reign of an Emperor.

| Inscription | Traditional Chinese | Simplified Chinese | Years of production | Emperor | Image |
|---|---|---|---|---|---|
| Dazhong Tongbao | 大中通寶 | 大中通宝 | 1361–1393 | Zhu Yuanzhang | |
| Hongwu Tongbao | 洪武通寶 | 洪武通宝 | 1367–1393 | Hongwu Emperor | |
| Yongle Tongbao | 永樂通寶 | 永乐通宝 | 1408–1424 | Yongle Emperor | |
| Xuande Tongbao | 宣德通寶 | 宣德通宝 | 1426–1435 | Xuande Emperor | |
| Hongzhi Tongbao | 弘治通寶 | 弘治通宝 | 1488–1505 | Hongzhi Emperor | |
| Jiajing Tongbao | 嘉靖通寶 | 嘉靖通宝 | 1527–1567 | Jiajing Emperor | |
| Jiajing Anbao | 嘉靖安寶 | 嘉靖安宝 | 1527–1567 | Jiajing Emperor | |
| Longqing Tongbao | 隆慶通寶 | 隆庆通宝 | 1570–1572 | Longqing Emperor | |
| Wanli Tongbao | 萬曆通寶 | 万历通宝 | 1572–1620 | Wanli Emperor | |
| Wanli Nianzao | 萬曆年造 | 万历年造 | 1572–1620 | Wanli Emperor | |
| Taichang Tongbao | 泰昌通寶 | 泰昌通宝 | 1620 | Taichang Emperor | |
| Tianqi Tongbao | 天啟通寶 | 天启通宝 | 1620–1627 | Tianqi Emperor | |
| Chongzhen Tongbao | 崇禎通寶 | 崇祯通宝 | 1628–1644 | Chongzhen Emperor | |

Note that under the reign of the Zhengde Emperor no copper-alloy cash coins were minted however a very large number of Zhengde Tongbao (正德通寶) coin amulets exist, the production of these coin-like amulets started from the late Ming dynasty period and these amulets are still being produced today.

=== Guizhou local issues ===
During the Hongzhi period from 1488 until 1505 some Tribal Commissioners in the province of Guizhou issued their own cash coins, rather than being bases on reign titles the inscriptions were based on place names.

| Inscription | Traditional Chinese | Simplified Chinese | Emperor | Image |
|---|---|---|---|---|
| Shuiguan Tongbao | 水官通寶 | 水官通宝 | Hongzhi Emperor | |
| Taiguan Tongbao | 太官通寶 | 太官通宝 | Hongzhi Emperor | |
| Huoguan Tongbao | 火官通寶 | 火官通宝 | Hongzhi Emperor | |
| Dading Tongbao | 大定通寶 | 大定通宝 | Hongzhi Emperor | |
| Taiding Tongbao | 太定通寶 | 太定通宝 | Hongzhi Emperor | |
| Taizi Tongbao | 太子通寶 | 太子通宝 | Hongzhi Emperor | |

=== Yunnan local issues ===
Under the Ming dynasty the territory which used to belong to the Dali Kingdom cast their own coins, these cash coins were issued in the province of Yunnan under the reign of the Hongzhi Emperor and are known to be of poor workmanship and crude casting, it is often unknown if these cash coins were cast by the Bai people in Dali, the Hmong tribes living in the area, or one of the many other tribes that live in Yunnan as records of their casting weren't bring kept. Many of these cash coins were also cast by using regular cash coins as "mother coins" which explains their rather crude appearances.

These Yunnan local issue cash coins include:

| Inscription | Traditional Chinese | Simplified Chinese | Emperor | Image |
|---|---|---|---|---|
| Huoping Xinbao | 火平信寶 | 火平信宝 | Hongzhi Emperor | |
| Hongwu Tongbao | 洪武通寶 | 洪武通宝 | Hongzhi Emperor | |
| Hongzhi Tongbao | 弘治通寶 | 弘治通宝 | Hongzhi Emperor | |
| Taiping Tongbao | 太平通寶 | 太平通宝 | Hongzhi Emperor | |
| Dazhou Tongbao | 大周通寶 | 大周通宝 | Hongzhi Emperor | |
| Kaiyuan Tongbao | 開元通寶 | 开元通宝 | Hongzhi Emperor | |

== Ming-Qing transitional period ==
This is a list of cash coins produced during the transition from Ming to Qing.

=== Southern Ming dynasty ===
List of cash coins produced by the Southern Ming dynasty:

| Inscription | Traditional Chinese | Simplified Chinese | Years of production | Emperor | Image |
|---|---|---|---|---|---|
| Hongguang Tongbao | 弘光通寶 | 弘光通宝 | 1644–1645 | Hongguang Emperor | |
| Daming Tongbao | 大明通寶 | 大明通宝 | 1644–1646 | Zhu Changfang | |
| Longwu Tongbao | 隆武通寶 | 隆武通宝 | 1645–1646 | Longwu Emperor | |
| Yongli Tongbao | 永曆通寶 | 永历通宝 | 1646–1659 | Yongli Emperor | |

=== Kingdom of Tungning (Taiwan) ===
Under Koxinga the Kingdom of Tungning (which was a state loyal to the Southern Ming dynasty) had ordered Yongli Tongbao cash coins to be produced (presumably) in Nagasaki, these coins circulated exclusively in Taiwan. The production of these coins lasted until 1682.

| Inscription | Traditional Chinese | Simplified Chinese | Years of production | Kings | Image |
|---|---|---|---|---|---|
| Yongli Tongbao | 永曆通寶 | 永历通宝 | 1651–1682 | All | |

=== Rebels ===
| Inscription | Traditional Chinese | Simplified Chinese | Years of production | Monarch | Image |
|---|---|---|---|---|---|
| Yongchang Tongbao | 永昌通寶 | 永昌通宝 | 1644–1645 | Li Zicheng | |
| Dashun Tongbao | 大順通寶 | 大顺通宝 | 1644–1647 | Zhang Xianzhong | |
| Xiwang Shanggong | 西王賞功 | 西王赏功 | 1644–1647 | Zhang Xianzhong | |
| Xingchao Tongbao | 興朝通寶 | 兴朝通宝 | 1648–1657 | Sun Kewang | |
| Yumin Tongbao | 裕民通寶 | 裕民通宝 | 1674–1676 | Geng Jingzhong | |
| Liyong Tongbao | 利用通寶 | 利用通宝 | 1674–1678 | Wu Sangui | |
| Zhaowu Tongbao | 昭武通寶 | 昭武通宝 | 1678 | Wu Sangui | |
| Honghua Tongbao | 洪化通寶 | 洪化通宝 | 1679–1681 | Wu Shifan | |

== Later Jin dynasty (1616–1636) ==
The following coins were issued by the Later Jin dynasty:

| Inscription | Latin script | Denominations | Years of mintage | Khan | Image |
|---|---|---|---|---|---|
| Manchu: ᠠᠪᡴᠠᡳ ᡶᡠᠯᡳᠩᡤᠠ ᡥᠠᠨ ᠵᡳᡴᠠ | Abkai fulingga han jiha | 1 wén | 1616–1626 | Abkai fulingga Khan | |
| 天命通寳 | Tiān Mìng Tōng Bǎo | 1 wén | 1616–1626 | Abkai fulingga Khan | |
| Manchu: ᠰᡠᡵᡝ ᡥᠠᠨ ᠨᡳ ᠵᡳᡴᠠ | Sure han ni jiha | 10 wén | 1627–1643 | Sure Khan | |

A cash coin with the inscription "Tiancong Tongbao" (天聰通寳) reported to be in the denominations of 1 wén and 10 wén has also been attributed to Hong Taiji, however the authenticity of this coin is doubtful.

== Qing dynasty ==
Qing dynasty era cash coins generally bear the reign title of the Emperor in Chinese characters, with only a single change of reign title occurring with the Qixiang Emperor becoming the Tongzhi Emperor by decision of his mother, Empress Dowager Cixi.

| Inscription | Traditional Chinese | Simplified Chinese | Hànyǔ Pīnyīn | Denominations | Years of mintage | Image | Emperor |
|---|---|---|---|---|---|---|---|
| Shunzhi Tongbao | 順治通寶 | 顺治通宝 | shùn zhì tōng bǎo | 1 wén | 1643–1661 | Coin. Qing Dynasty. Shunzhi Tongbao. Bao Yuan. obv | Shunzhi Emperor |
| Kangxi Tongbao | 康熙通寶 | 康熙通宝 | kāng xī tōng bǎo | 1 wén | 1661–1722 | Coin. Qing Dynasty. Kangxi Tongbao. Bao Quan. obv | Kangxi Emperor |
| Yongzheng Tongbao | 雍正通寶 | 雍正通宝 | yōng zhèng tōng bǎo | 1 wén | 1722–1735 | S597 ShiZong YongZheng TP H22159 1ar85 (9125482270) | Yongzheng Emperor |
| Qianlong Tongbao | 乾隆通寶 | 乾隆通宝 | qián lóng tōng bǎo | 1 wén, 10 wén | 1735–1796 (1912) (Note: In Xinjiang coins bearing the inscription Qián Lóng Tōng Bǎo (乾隆通寶) continued to be produced until the fall of the Qing dynasty to commemorate the regions annexation under the Qianlong Emperor, 1 in every 5 coins cast in Xinjiang bear this inscription regardless of era.) | Coin. Qing Dynasty. Qianlong Tongbao. Bao Quan. obv | Qianlong Emperor |
| Jiaqing Tongbao | 嘉慶通寶 | 嘉庆通宝 | jiā qìng tōng bǎo | 1 wén | 1796–1820 | | Jiaqing Emperor |
| Daoguang Tongbao | 道光通寶 | 道光通宝 | dào guāng tōng bǎo | 1 wén, 5 wén, 10 wén | 1820–1850 | Coin. Qing Dynasty. Daoguang Tongbao. Bao Quan. obv | Daoguang Emperor |
| Xianfeng Tongbao | 咸豐通寶 | 咸丰通宝 | xián fēng tōng bǎo | 1 wén, 5 wén, 10 wén, 50 wén, 100 wén | 1850–1861 | | Xianfeng Emperor |
| Xianfeng Zhongbao | 咸豐重寶 | 咸丰重宝 | xián fēng zhòng bǎo | 4 wén, 5 wén, 8 wén, 10 wén, 20 wén, 30 wén, 40 wén, 50 wén, 100 wén | 1850–1861 | 10cash WenZong XianFeng Zhejiang H221031 1ar85 (8506370671) | Xianfeng Emperor |
| Xianfeng Yuanbao | 咸豐元寶 | 咸丰元宝 | xián fēng yuán bǎo | 80 wén, 100 wén, 200 wén, 300 wén, 500 wén, 1000 wén | 1850–1861 | Qing Dynasty 500 Cash | Xianfeng Emperor |
| Qixiang Tongbao | 祺祥通寶 | 祺祥通宝 | qí xiáng tōng bǎo | 1 wén | 1861 | | Tongzhi Emperor |
| Qixiang Zhongbao | 祺祥重寶 | 祺祥重宝 | qí xiáng zhòng bǎo | 10 wén | 1861 | | Tongzhi Emperor |
| Tongzhi Tongbao | 同治通寶 | 同治通宝 | tóng zhì tōng bǎo | 1 wén, 5 wén, 10 wén | 1862–1875 | | Tongzhi Emperor |
| Tongzhi Zhongbao | 同治重寶 | 同治重宝 | tóng zhì zhòng bǎo | 4 wén, 10 wén | 1862–1875 | | Tongzhi Emperor |
| Guangxu Tongbao | 光緒通寶 | 光绪通宝 | guāng xù tōng bǎo | 1 wén, 10 wén | 1875–1908 | 1cash DeZong Zhili trait H221458 1ar85 (8581385185) | Guangxu Emperor |
| Guangxu Zhongbao | 光緒重寶 | 光绪重宝 | guāng xù zhòng bǎo | 5 wén, 10 wén | 1875–1908 | | Guangxu Emperor |
| Xuantong Tongbao | 宣統通寶 | 宣统通宝 | xuān tǒng tōng bǎo | 1 wén, 10 wén | 1909–1911 | | Xuantong Emperor |

=== Xinjiang issues ===
Certain parts of Xinjiang under Qing rule had a monetary system separate from that was separate from that of China proper, this was largely due to the fact that the area which formerly belonged to Dzungaria paid with pūl coins which were made from almost pure copper, when some these pūl coins were melted down to make "red cash coins" the pūl-system was essentially continued and 1 "red cash coin" had a value of 10 regular cash coins. Another differentiating feature of Xinjiang as a whole was that under the Jiaqing Emperor it was ordered that 1 in 5 coins produced in Xinjiang should bear the inscription Qianlong Tongbao (乾隆通寶) to honour the Qianlong Emperor, and celebrate his conquest of the region. New obverse inscriptions were introduced by the Kucha mint during the early twentieth century however the production of "red cash coins" with these new inscriptions didn't last very long as they featured only two different dates from the Chinese cyclical calendar during the Guangxu era and the Kucha mint closed in 1909.

The following "red cash coins" with new inscriptions were produced by the Kucha mint in Xinjiang:

| Inscription | Traditional Chinese | Simplified Chinese | Denominations | Years of mintage | Emperor | Image |
|---|---|---|---|---|---|---|
| Guangxu Dingwei | 光緒丁未 | 光绪丁未 | 10 wén | 1907 | Guangxu Emperor | |
| Guangxu Wushen | 光緒戊申 | 光绪戊申 | 10 wén | 1908 | Guangxu Emperor | |

== Rashidin Khan Khoja ==
During the Dungan revolt from 1862 to 1877, Sultan Rashidin Khan Khoja proclaimed a Jihad against the Qing dynasty in 1862, he issued Chinese-style cash coins minted at the Aksu and Kucha mints with exclusive Arabic inscriptions.

| Obverse inscription (Romanised) | Reverse inscription (Romanised) | Sultan | Mint | Years of production | Image |
|---|---|---|---|---|---|
| سيد غازي راشدين خان (Sayyid Ghazi Rashidin Khan) (Note: On the series of coins minted in Kucha from 1865 to 1867, the characters are larger than the previous one which featured rather small Arabic writing.) | زرب دار السلطانات كوجا (Zarb dar al-Sultanat Kuqa) | Rashidin Khan Khoja | Kucha | 1864–1865 | |
| سيد غازي راشدين خان (Sayyid Ghazi Rashidin Khan) | زرب دار السلطانات كوجا (Zarb dar al-Sultanat Kuqa) | Rashidin Khan Khoja | Kucha | 1865–1867 | |
| سيد غازي راشدين خان (Sayyid Ghazi Rashidin Khan) | زرب دار السلطانات كوجا (Zarb dar al-Sultanat Kuqa) | Rashidin Khan Khoja | Aksu | 1864–1867 | |

== Taiping Heavenly Kingdom ==
In 1850 the Taiping Rebellion was started by the head of the God worshippers Hong Xiuquan who founded the Taiping Heavenly Kingdom, this rebellion lasted until 1864. Although very little documentation exists about the coinage manufactured by the Taiping rebels, it is known that in June 1853 the occupying Taiping rebels ordered copper workers in Tianjing (present day Nanjing) with the skills to cast coins to open new furnaces for the production of cash coins with the inscription Tianguo Shengbao that were reported to be "the size of foreign coins" (Mexican pesos), these coins were reported to be of very poor workmanship and their production was quickly discontinued and although no coins fitting this description are extend it is known that Taiping rebels in other areas and provinces did cast coinage.

The following cash coins are known to have been cast by the Taiping Heavenly Kingdom:

| Obverse inscription (Romanised) | Reverse inscription (Romanised) | Denominations | Years of production | Image |
|---|---|---|---|---|
| 天囯 (Tianguo) | 通寳 (Tongbao) | 10 wén | 1853–1855 | |
| 天囯 (Tianguo) | 聖寶 (Shengbao) | 10 wén | 1856–1860 | |
| 天囯聖寶 (Tianguo Shengbao) | 太平 (Taiping) | 1 wén | 1858–1864 | |
| 天囯聖寶 (Tianguo Shengbao) | | 5 wén | 1850s | |
| 太平天囯 (Taiping Tianguo) | 聖寶 (Shengbao) | 1 wén, 5 wén, 10 wén, 50 wén | 1860–1862 | |
| 天囯太平 (Tianguo Taiping) | 聖寶 (Shengbao) | 1 wén | 1861–1864 | |
| 太平聖寶 (Taiping Shengbao) | 天囯 (Tianguo) | 1 wén, 5 wén | 1861–1864 | |
| 太平聖宝 (Taiping Shengbao) | 天囯 (Tianguo) | | 1860s | |
| 太平 (Taiping) (Note: These are perhaps the rarest of all cash coins issued by the Taiping Heavenly Kingdom.) | 聖寶 (Shengbao) | | 1860s | |

== Heaven and Earth Society, Shanghai Small Swords Society, and other secret societies during the Taiping rebellion ==
At the time of the Taiping rebellion a large number of secret societies such as the Heaven and Earth Society took advantage of the chaos and started to flourish, these secret societies all claimed to want to overthrow the Qing dynasty and restore the Ming dynasty, for this reason many of the coins cast by these secret societies contain hidden messages such as some of them containing characters from the reign titles of Ming dynasty emperors.

=== Shanghai Small Swords Society ===
The Shanghai Small Swords Society under the leadership of Liu Lichuan seized control of the city of Shanghai in September 1853 and awarded themselves the period title of "Tianyun" (天運), as Shanghai had a lot of gold and silver but not much cash coins the rebels confiscated all scrap copper they could find and this was all cast into cash coins with the inscription "Taiping Tongbao" (太平通寶) on the obverse and a sun and a crescent on the reverse, the sun (日) and moon (月) symbolised their intent on restoring the Ming (明). As merchants who traded with Shanghai entered the Qing those found carrying cash coins issued by rebels were arrested and put on trial and after a few were executed the Shanghai Small Swords society decided that these coins were essentially useless and decided to cast coins based on the Xianfeng reign title.

| Obverse inscription (Romanised) | Reverse inscription (Romanised) | Calligraphic style | Years of production | Image |
|---|---|---|---|---|
| 太平通寶 (Taiping Tongbao) | | Northern Song era Li script | 1854–1855 | |
| 太平通寶 (Taiping Tongbao) | Crescent (moon) above. 明 (Ming) below. | Northern Song era Li script | 1854–1855 | |
| 太平通寶 (Taiping Tongbao) | Sun (circle) above, Crescent (moon) below. | Contemporary regular script | 1854–1855 | |
| 太平通寶 (Taiping Tongbao) | Manchu: ᠪᠣᠣ ᠶᡡᠨ (Boo Yūn) | Contemporary regular script | 1854–1855 | |

=== Other secret societies ===
| Obverse inscription (Romanised) | Reverse inscription (Romanised) | Years of production | Secret society | Image |
|---|---|---|---|---|
| 太平通寶 (Taiping Tongbao) | 文 (Wen) above. | 1858–1864 | Small Sword and Heaven and Earth Societies (天地會) | |
| 太平通寶 (Taiping Tongbao) | 文 (Wen) sideways right. | 1858–1864 | Small Sword and Heaven and Earth Societies (天地會) | |
| 開元通寶 (Kaiyuan Tongbao) | 武 (Wu) above. | 1858–1864 | Small Sword and Heaven and Earth Societies (天地會) | |
| 開元通寶 (Kaiyuan Tongbao) | 武 (Wu) sideways right. | 1858–1864 | Small Sword and Heaven and Earth Societies (天地會) | |
| 天朝通寶 (Tianchao Tongbao) | 永 (Yong) above. | 1858–1864 | Small Sword and Heaven and Earth Societies (天地會) | |
| 天朝通寶 (Tianchao Tongbao) | 永 (Yong) upside down below. | 1858–1864 | Small Sword and Heaven and Earth Societies (天地會) | |
| 黃帝通寶 (Huangdi Tongbao) | 聖 (Sheng) above. | 1858–1864 | Small Sword and Heaven and Earth Societies (天地會) | |
| 黃帝通寶 (Huangdi Tongbao) | 聖 (Sheng) sideways right. | 1858–1864 | Small Sword and Heaven and Earth Societies (天地會) | |
| 黃帝通寶 (Huangdi Tongbao) | Manchu: ᠪᠣᠣ 浙 (Boo Zhe) | 1858–1864 | Small Sword and Heaven and Earth Societies (天地會) | |
| 義記金錢 (Yiji Jinqian) | Two intertwined lozenges on the right and left side. | 1858–1863 | Small Sword and Heaven and Earth Societies (天地會) | |
| 義記金錢 (Yiji Jinqian) | The Chinese character "離" (lí) above and two intertwined lozenges on the right and left side. | 1858–1863 | Small Sword and Heaven and Earth Societies (天地會) | |
| 義記金錢 (Yiji Jinqian) | 震忠團練 (Zhenzhong Tuanlian) | 1858–1863 | Small Sword and Heaven and Earth Societies (天地會) | |
| 明道通寶 (Mingdao Tongbao) | 天 (Tian) | 1850s | The Triad Society (三合會) | |

=== Other contemporary rebellions ===
Other than secret societies several other rebellions cast their own coinages contemporary to the Taiping rebellion, in Guizhou the rebel Zhang Baoshan who claimed descent from the Hongwu Emperor is said by David Hartill to have cast the Sitong Tongbao (嗣統通寶) cash coins according to two references. Li Wenmao who was the leader of the Triad Society in the province of Guangdong proclaimed half to be "the King who shall restore peace" (平靖王) in March 1857 but his rebellion got suppressed by the Qing in 1858. The coinage cast by Li Wenmao often contains the character "勝" (victory or to vanquish) which is often found in lodges of Tiandihui groups creating the inscription "勝寶" (victorious treasure or vanquishing treasure), meanwhile as the guerilla tactics of the Guangdong Triad relied on having their forces be divided into a "left flank", "right flank", "middle flank", "front flank", and "rear flank" this is reflected in the reverse inscriptions of the coins cast by this rebellion as "营" (garrison or camp) is accompanied by which flank the garrison belonged to.

| Obverse inscription (Romanised) | Reverse inscription (Romanised) | Years of production | Rebel leader | Image |
|---|---|---|---|---|
| 平靖通寶 (Pingjing Tongbao) | 中 (Zhong) in seal script on the right. | 1857–1858 | Li Wenmao (李文茂) | |
| 平靖通寶 (Pingjing Tongbao) | 中营 (Zhongying) | 1857–1858 | Li Wenmao (李文茂) | |
| 平靖通寶 (Pingjing Tongbao) | 前营 (Qianying) | 1857–1858 | Li Wenmao (李文茂) | |
| 平靖通寶 (Pingjing Tongbao) | 後营 (Houying) | 1857–1858 | Li Wenmao (李文茂) | |
| 平靖通寶 (Pingjing Tongbao) | 左营 (Zuoying) | 1857–1858 | Li Wenmao (李文茂) | |
| 平靖通寶 (Pingjing Tongbao) | 右营 (Youying) | 1857–1858 | Li Wenmao (李文茂) | |
| 平靖通寶 (Pingjing Tongbao) | 御林軍 (Yulinjun) | 1857–1858 | Li Wenmao (李文茂) | |
| 平靖通寶 (Pingjing Tongbao) | 長勝軍 (Changshengjun) | 1857–1858 | Li Wenmao (李文茂) | |
| 嗣統通寶 (Sitong Tongbao) | | 1860–1863 | Zhang Baoshan (張保山) | |

== Republic of China ==
Chinese cash coins continued to be produced into the first year of the Republic of China until their production was completely phased out in 1912. A large number of trial coins were also cast, however these weren't ever officially issued.

The following cash coins were cast during the Republic of China in 1912:

| Inscription (Obverse, Reverse) | Traditional Chinese (Obverse, Reverse) | Simplified Chinese (Obverse, Reverse) | Issuing office | Image |
|---|---|---|---|---|
| Fujian Tongbao, 1 cash | 福建通寶, 一文 | 福建通宝, 一文 | Fujian province | |
| Fujian Tongbao, 2 cash | 福建通寶, 二文 | 福建通宝, 二文 | Fujian province | |
| Minguo Tongbao, Dongchuan | 民國通寶, 東川 | 民国通宝, 东川 | Dongchuan, Yunnan | |
| Minguo Tongbao, 10 cash | 民國通寶, 當十 | 民国通宝, 当十 | Dongchuan, Yunnan | |

== See also ==
- List of Japanese cash coins by inscription
- Japanese mon (currency)
- Korean mun
- Ryukyuan mon
- Vietnamese cash
- Economic history of China (pre-1911)

== Sources ==
- Hartill, David (2005). Cast Chinese Coins: A Historical Catalogue. Trafford. ISBN 978-1-4120-5466-9.
