= Song dynasty coinage (disambiguation) =

Song dynasty coinage may refer to coins produced by the Chinese Song dynasty from the following periods:

- Coins from the Northern Song dynasty (960–1127).
- Coins from the Southern Song dynasty (1127–1279).
