= Zhaona Xinbao =

Chinese cash coin-like trust token

- Southern Song Dynasty, China
- Mass: 5 g
- Diameter: 26 mm
- Composition: Bronze, rare instances in silver and gold
- Years of minting: 1131 (Shaoxing 1)
- Circulation: Limited, not meant for general circulation

Obverse
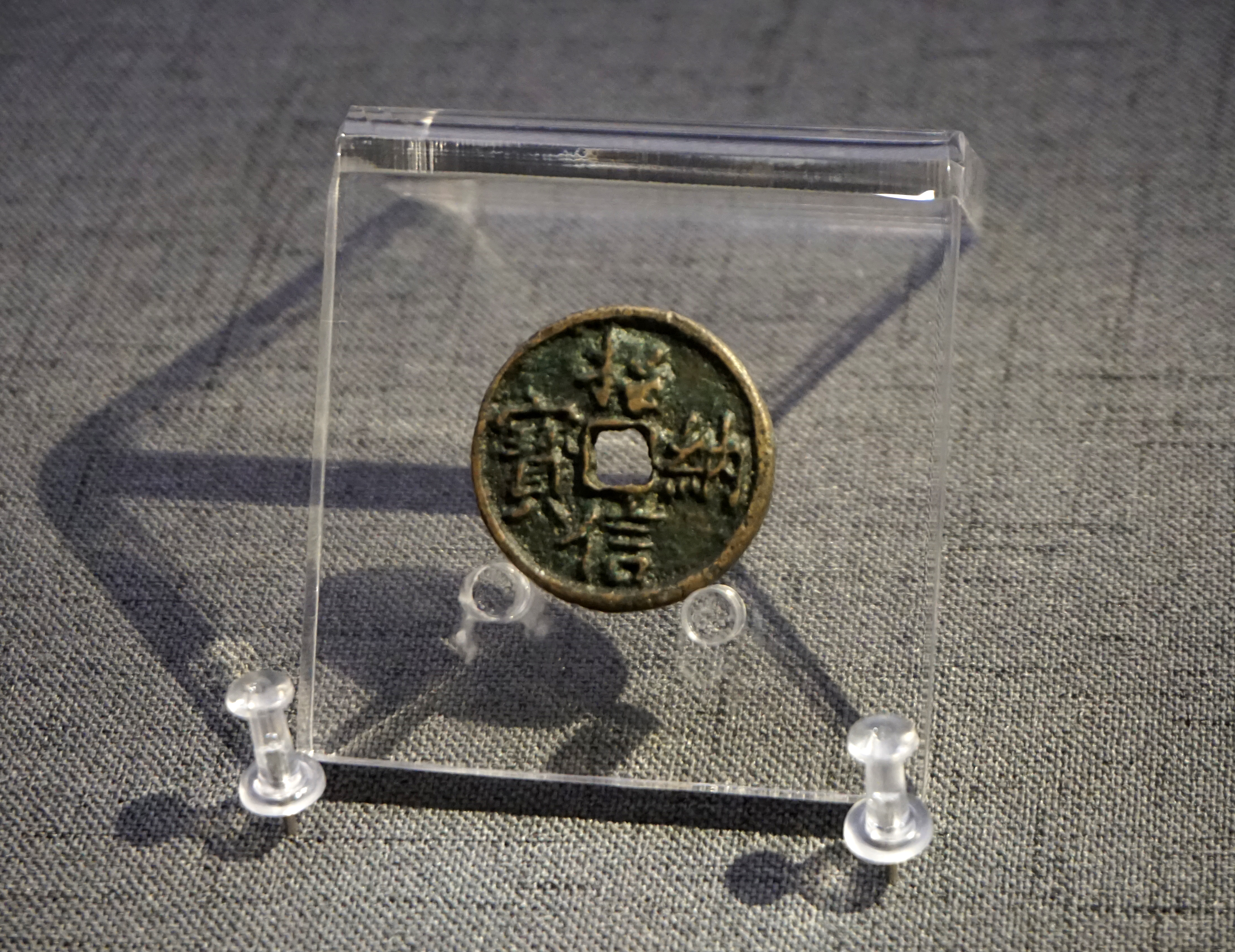
- Design: "Zhaona Xinbao" (招納信寶), "To beckon, to admit, to trust, treasure"
- Design date: 1131

Reverse
- Design: "Shi" (使) and possibly "Shang" (上), indicating an official mission and possibly a signature
- Design date: 1131

The Zhaona Xinbao (traditional Chinese: 招納信寶; simplified Chinese: 招纳信宝; pinyin: zhāo nà xìn bǎo; lit. 'Treasure (coin) that serves as a letter of introduction') is a special type of Southern Song dynasty cash coin developed as a propaganda and psychological warfare tool for recruiting defectors from the army of the Jurchen Jin dynasty around the year Shaoxing 1 (or the Gregorian year 1131) under the reign of Emperor Gaozong. These special coins superficially resemble traditional Chinese cash coins but contain an inscription alluding to their intent, generally these Zhaona Xinbao tokens were made from bronze but in very rare cases they were also made from silver or gold.

== History ==
In the year 1131 the military forces of the Song and Jurchen Jin dynasties were encamped opposite to each other on each side of the Yangtze River, during the Summer of this year the forces of the Song dynasty were under the command of the governor of Hubei General Liu Guangshi (劉光世, 1089–1142) while the forces of the Jin were under the command of Wan Yanchang (完顏昌). As both armies were roughly equal in manpower both sides had trouble advancing on the other resulting in a stalemate. To break this stalemate Liu Guangshi decided to cast a special type of cash coin in Jiangzhou (present day Jiujiang, Jiangxi) which wasn't meant to circulate in the same manner as regular coinage but to encourage members of the Jin military to defect to the Song side. Akin to the types of Chinese cash coins that were circulating at the time they were primarily made from the copper-alloy bronze while a very small number of them were made from silver and even less were made from gold. As a large portion of the Jin military was made up of conscripted Han Chinese soldiers, General Liu believed that these soldiers were probably in a state of homesickness and had more desire to return home than to fight for a foreign power.

To this end Liu Guangshi ordered the creation of special cash coins with the inscription Zhaona Xinbao (招納信寶) which could be translated as "Treasure (coin) that recruits (Jin dynasty) soldiers who desire to return to their home" and adopted a policy that these special cash coins could be used to show that their defection from the Jin Army. When soldiers of the Jin Army were captured by the troops of Liu Guangshi rather than having them killed, he had them treated in a good manner and they were presented these Zhaona Xinbao coins and informed that anyone in possession of these coins could pass unhindered to the Song camp and then if they choose return safely back to their home. The captured Jin servicemen were then given handed these Zhaona Xinbao coins and were informed after they return to the Jurchen camp that they could hand these over to their compatriots who desired to desert to the Song. These captured Jin soldiers then returned to the Jin camp and secretly distributed these coins to other soldiers who also expressed a desire to defect.

These Zhaona Xinbao cash coins proved to be successful as they were instrumental in the desertion of tens of thousands of conscripted Jin soldiers to the Song Army, not all of the defected soldiers decided to use this opportunity to go back home but volunteered to fight on the side of the Song dynasty. The soldiers who deserted didn't only include ethnic Han Chinese but also included Khitans and Jurchens. These additional soldiers were organised into two newly created armies named the "Read Hearts" (赤心, chì xīn) and the "Army Appearing from Nowhere" (奇兵, qí bīng). The token coin proved to work and the enormous number of deserters forced the Jin general Wan Yanchang to call for his remaining troops to retreat. As the number of Zhaona Xinbao cash coins that was manufactured for this purpose was small and as they only "circulated" over a relatively small area not many authentic specimens are known to still exist today.

== Inscription ==
As the Zhaona Xinbao cash coins were manufactured to encourage conscripts from the Jin dynasty's military to defect and make sure that their passage to the army camps of the Song dynasty was safe the inscription had to reflect this purpose. The inscription itself is written in a clockwise manner and the type of Chinese calligraphy used is regular script. The characters on the obverse side of these trust tokens translate as the following:

Inscription	Traditional Chinese	Simplified Chinese	Translations
Zhao	招	招	To beckon, to summon, to recruit, to levy
Na	納	纳	To admit, to take, to receive, to accept
Xin	信	信	To trust, to believe, letter
Bao	寶	宝	Treasure, jewel, precious, rare

The inscription "Zhaona Xinbao" could be translated as "Treasure (coin) that serves as a letter of introduction" or "Treasure (coin) that recruits (Jin dynasty) soldiers who desire to return to their home" based on the context. Another possible translation is "the bearer of this treasure (coin) is able to return (or submit) to the authority of the Song dynasty safely" as Dr. Ding Fubao (丁福保) suggests because "zhao na" (招纳) has the alternative meaning of "submitting to the authority of another" (歸附, guī fù) in Mandarin Chinese. Alternative proposed English translations of the inscription of the Zhaona Xinbao are "Trust Token for Recruits" by Yu Liuliang and Yu Hong and "Pass Coin" by David Jen.

On the reverse side of these Zhaona Xinbao cash coins are two characters, one on the top above the square center hole and at the bottom below the square center hole. The top character always reads "Shi" (使) (Note: Could be translated as "cause", "send on a mission", "order", "envoy", "messenger", and/or "ambassador".) which indicates that these tokens had a mission that served an official function. The character below the square hole is usually claimed to be "Shang" (上) (Note: Could be translated as "top", "superior", "highest", "go up", and/or "send up".) but it seems to be a mirrored version of the character and no translation of it is known, general consensus among Chinese numismatists such as David Jen state that it in fact a signature, the signer is unknown but it might have been Liu Guangshi himself. On the silver version of the Zhaona Xinbao the "Shi" (使) is the same albeit diminutive in size however the character below the square center hole which is also presumed to be a signature resembles a "凵" (kǎn) with a "禾" (hé) in the middle.

== Surviving specimens ==
Due to the relatively small area where these cash coin-like tokens "circulated" and their low production numbers not many Zhaona Xinbao cash coins exist today; a bronze Zhaona Xinbao could be sold for ¥ 100,000 ($14,000) in the year 2016. Meanwhile, despite 20th century Chinese numismatic works mentioning several silver and gold versions of the Zhaona Xinbao being in the hands of some private collectors, their whereabouts are all currently unknown and both their cultural and market values are considered to be "priceless".

In 2006 the family of the well-known Chinese numismatist Ma Dingxiang (馬定祥) donated a Zhaona Xinbao cash coin to the Hangzhou Museum in Zhejiang. This Zhaona Xinbao cash coin is 26 millimeters in diameter and weighs 5 grams. Among the more easily observed characteristics of these cash coins is the fact that the "Bao" (寶) Chinese character could be described as being "unusually tall". Another bronze Zhaona Xinbao cash coin is in the collection of the National Museum of China.

During the early years of the Republic of China, a silver Zhaona Xinbao was reported to be in the hands of Fang Dishan (方地山) which Yuan Hanyun (袁寒雲) describes as being a wee bit bigger than the bronze variant. After Fang's death in the year 1936, the fate of this specimen became unknown. A gold version of the Zhaona Xinbao was in the hands of Chen Rentao (陳仁濤) who died in 1968 and the fate of this specimen is also unknown. The gold version of the Zhaona Xinbao are classified as "first-class national cultural relics" (國家一級文物, guó jiā yī jí wén wù) by the government of the People's Republic of China.

== See also ==
- Challenge coin

== Sources ==
- Hartill, David (22 September 2005). Cast Chinese Coins. Trafford, United Kingdom: Trafford Publishing. ISBN 978-1412054669.
- Jen, David (2000). Chinese Cash: Identification and Price Guide. Krause Publications. ISBN 978-0873418591.
