= Southern Song dynasty coinage =

Coinage of the Chinese dynasty

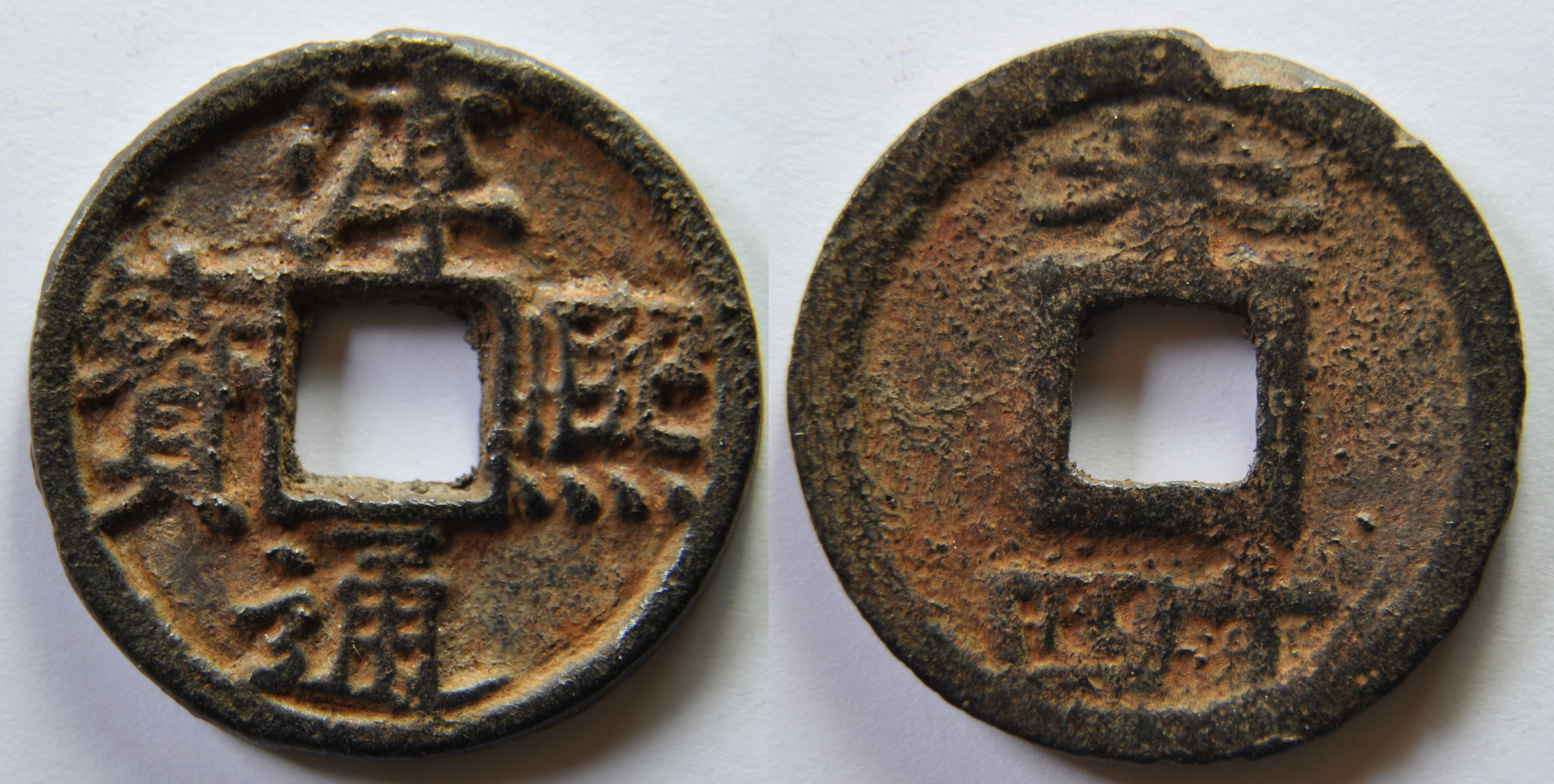
Clockwise inscriptions on the obverse; mint marks, and years on reserve are very typical elements of Southern Song coinage styles.

The Southern Song dynasty was an era of the Song dynasty after Kaifeng was captured by the Jurchen-led Jin dynasty in 1127. The government of the Song was forced to establish a new capital city at Lin'an (present day Hangzhou) which wasn't near any sources of copper so the quality of the cash coins produced under the Southern Song significantly deteriorated compared to the cast copper-alloy cash coins of the Northern Song dynasty. The Southern Song government preferred to invest in their defenses (as its incapable military easily fell to the Jin dynasty) while trying to remain passive towards the Jin dynasty establishing a long peace until the Mongols eventually annexed the Jin before marching down to the Song establishing the Yuan dynasty.

Coins from the Song dynasty have appeared in variants written in either standard (top-bottom-right-left) or clockwise (top-right-bottom-left).

The Southern Song dynasty saw the emergence of paper money, while coins were increasingly becoming a rarity. Iron cash coins also started to be used in greater numbers, at first due to the lack of copper, but later even as more copper was found the production of iron cash coins remained cheaper and an abundance of iron made it more attractive for the government to produce, while several problems such as the fact that iron is harder to inscribe, and that iron corrodes faster ensured the continued production of copper cash coins. Despite the chronic shortages of copper the Southern Song used special coins as a form of psychological warfare against Jin army defectors, and copper coins (and later silver sycees) would remain the standard of administration even for the newly introduced paper money.

== Background ==
The Northern Song dynasty saw the reunification of most parts of China proper and also of its currency. The Northern Song dynasty saw the widespread usage of "matched cash coins" which used different types of Chinese calligraphy for the same inscriptions and the reintroduction of cash coins of different denominations. Government corruption would lead to the Northern Song government producing large quantities of iron cash coins by the end of the reign of Emperor Zhezong.

By the time of the Chongning Zhongbao (崇寧重寶) cash coins of the Emperor Huizong, 10 wén cash coins had become the norm as the government used it as a method to confiscate the wealth of the people to enrich its treasury. In a story dating to the Northern Song dynasty time period, a man purchasing a bowl of soup is used to illustrate the hardship caused by the lack of 1 wén cash coins, which are known as Xiaoping cash coins (小平錢).

The story relates that a patron bought a bowl of soup and paid for it with a "10 cash" coin. The soup seller did not have any small change and so encouraged the customer to eat more and more soup. The customer continued to eat but finally sighed and said, "it is fortunate that my coin is only a "10 cash". If it had been a "100 cash" it would have killed me!"

- Translated by Gary Ashkenazy of the Primaltrek website from Mandarin Chinese.

These 10 wén cash coins were so overvalued by the government that they were eventually devalued by the market until they were only worth the equivalent of 3 cash coins.

== History ==
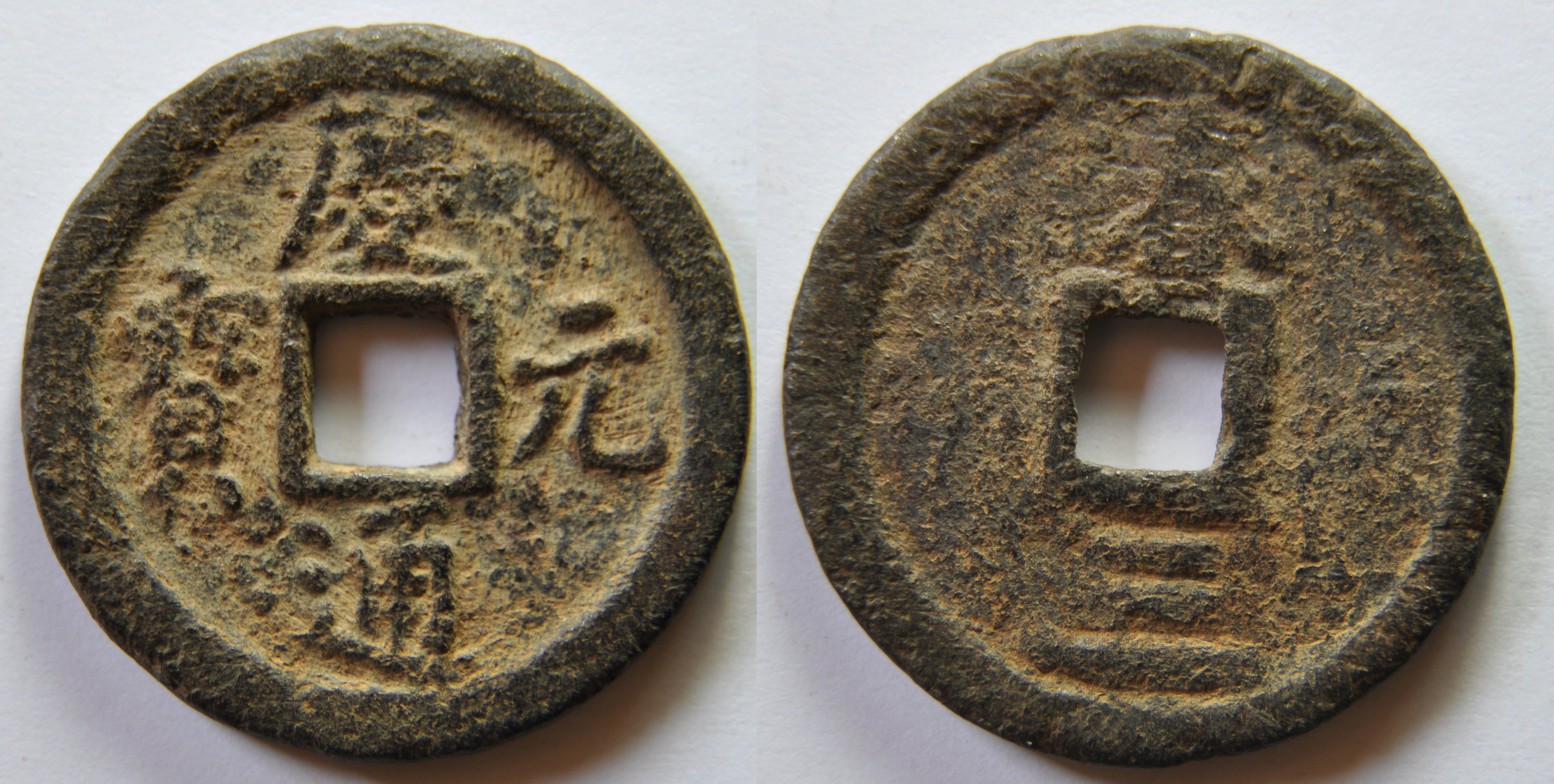
A coin with a clockwise inscription and with the year of minting on the reverse, cast in the 3rd year of the Qing Yuan era (1197).

The Southern Song would suffer from what had been called "currency famines" or Qian Huang (錢荒), during the mid-13th century, this was because the production of bronze coinage had fallen to merely 2 to 3% of what it had been under the Northern Song, meanwhile the relative value of silver compared to bronze had steadily increased leading to the Song government adopting silver as the new standard as the value of silver would remain pretty much standard at the entire duration of the Southern Song while the value of bronze would fluctuate enormously.

The Song dynasty had several "monetary regions" which all had their own separate combination of bronze, and/or iron coins, paper money, and silver sycees in circulation. These separate regional currency standards created distinct regional characters that would often hinder interregional trade between them. The Song government's general inability to create enough bronze wén coins to circulate helped strengthen this monetary diversity that would impede trade, even though the Northern Song had enough bronze for this demand and to even create large coins called "biscuit coins", the southern regions lacked these resources after they had lost the North to the Jin.

Despite the large variety in different media of exchange, Southern Song dynasty documents always measure prices in bronze coins (guàn 貫, and wén 文), which includes the value of silver bullion itself. After Wang Anshi reformed the fiscal administration of the Southern Song between 1069 and 1085, silver became a vital element in administrative book-keeping, especially in certain regions rich in silver such as modern-day Sichuan.

In the year 1173 during the reign of Emperor Xiaozong the period title was proclaimed to be Chunxi with the "Chun" written as "纯". Only six days later after this proclamation, the "Chun" was officially changed to be written in Hanzi as "淳". The Tongan mint in the Anhui region produced a very small quantity of Chunxi Yuanbao (纯熙元寶) iron cash coins with the chun written as "纯". These diminutive iron coins today are considered to be very rare. Furthermore, during the beginning of the Chunxi period, bronze cash coins produced from this era and continuing to the very end of the Southern Song dynasty, tended to have their inscriptions (or legends) written in a form of Chinese calligraphy that is today known as the "Song style script" or "regular script". For this reason, there are in fact fewer number of varieties of bronze Song dynasty cash coins from this period onwards compared to those from earlier periods.

Until 1179 the Northern Song era's policies of casting coins in varying typefaces continued but after this year most coins tended to only have Regular script inscriptions. Beginning in 1180 coins cast by the Southern Song government started to cast the reign year on the reverses of coins as well as mint marks in order to stop forgeries from circulated, this was because the technology to cast inscriptions on both sides of the coins hasn't been adopted yet by private mints at the time. From 1180 until the end of the Song dynasty very few bronze coins were produced by the government as the preference went to iron, this was because bronze cash coins needed to have a specific typeface which was more intricate to produce.

A constant problem for the Song government was the outflow of its currency, particularly to the Jin dynasty which didn't produce much coinage of its own. This outflow of coins eventually caused the Song government to produce more paper money in order to sustain its economy.

By 1160 bronze coins had become a rarity, and became largely an abstract measurement of value rather than a tangible currency, the most important attribute of bronze coins after this year was as a measurement for the value of other currencies, by 1161 a shortage in wén coins had forced the Southern Song government to halve the salary of their soldiers and rather than pay them 50% in Huizi, 30% in silver, and only 20% in bronze coins. After 1170 the Song court established Huizi paper money on a permanent basis based on the "Pinda" (品搭) formula that mandated that taxes were only half paid in coin and the other half in Huizi notes. This formula would prove successful as it increased the value of Huizi in circulation, while also increasing the demand for the uncommon wén coins. Huizi notes were increasingly used for commercial purposes while bronze coins were often being hoarded up as savings, although the Huizi notes were also hoarded up as savings, the government had set up a 3-year expiry term so people would have to constantly renew their banknotes at government offices to stop them from hoarding the value up like what happened with bronze coinage.

Due to the constant threat of the Mongol Empire and increased military expenditures the Song government started to cast more coins leading to inflation. Eventually coins became a rarely used item in Lin'an causing the Southern Song government to start producing small coin tallies called Qian Pai (錢牌) in denominations of 10, 40, 100, 200, 300, and 500 wén, in reality however the denominations were discounted per 100 wén (often at 30%) and were worth less on the actual market, an example of this would be 77 wén for official business, 75 wén for trading purposes, and could be discounted to as low as 56 for writings. The majority of Qian Pai tablets tend to have the description "(for) use in Lin'An Prefecture" (臨安府行用), the contemporary capital city. The Qian Pai are attributed to the Jingding period (1260–1264).

As the Mongols started to advance Southwards the last 3 emperors of the Song dynasty did not cast any coins as they had neither the time to set up any mints nor the resources to produce any cast coins.

== List of cash coins produced by the Song dynasty ==
The coins produced during the Song dynasty period include:

=== Northern Song dynasty cash coins (Note: This list is included because Northern Song dynasty coins still circulated in the Southern Song dynasty.) ===
Inscription	Traditional Chinese	Simplified Chinese	Scripts	Period minted	Emperor	Image
Song Yuan Tong Bao	宋元通寶	宋元通宝	Regular script	960–976	Taizu	
Tai Ping Tong Bao	太平通寶	太平通宝	Regular script	976–989	Taizong	
Chun Hua Yuan Bao	淳化元寶	淳化元宝	Regular script, Seal script, Running script	990–994	Taizong	
Zhi Dao Yuan Bao	至道元寶	至道元宝	Regular script, Grass script, Running script	995–997	Taizong	
Xian Ping Yuan Bao	咸平元寶	咸平元宝	Regular script	998–1003	Zhenzong	
Jing De Yuan Bao	景德元寶	景德元宝	Regular script	1004–1007	Zhenzong	
Xiang Fu Tong Bao	祥符通寶	祥符通宝	Regular script, Running script	1008–1016	Zhenzong	
Xiang Fu Yuan Bao	祥符元寶	祥符元宝	Regular script	1008–1016	Zhenzong	
Tian Xi Tong Bao	天禧通寶	天禧通宝	Regular script	1017–1022	Zhenzong	
Tian Sheng Yuan Bao	天聖元寶	天圣元宝	Regular script, Seal script	1023–1031	Renzong	
Ming Dao Yuan Bao	明道元寶	明道元宝	Regular script, Seal script	1032–1033	Renzong	
Jing You Yuan Bao	景佑元寶	景佑元宝	Regular script, Seal script	1034–1038	Renzong	
Huang Song Tong Bao	皇宋通寶	皇宋通宝	Regular script, Seal script, Nine-fold seal script (Note: A rare variety of this cash coin has its inscription written in Nine-fold seal script (九叠篆) which was a style of Chinese calligraphy used during this period that was usually only reserved for official Song dynasty seals.)	1039–1054	Renzong	
Kang Ding Yuan Bao	康定元寶	康定元宝	Regular script	1040	Renzong	
Qing Li Zhong Bao	慶歷重寶	庆历重宝	Regular script	1041–1048	Renzong	
Zhi he Tong Bao	至和通寶	至和通宝	Regular script, Seal script	1054–1055	Renzong	
Zhi he Yuan Bao	至和元寶	至和元宝	Regular script, Seal script	1054–1055	Renzong	
Zhi he Zhong Bao	至和重寶	至和重宝	Regular script, Seal script	1054–1055	Renzong	
Jia You Tong Bao	嘉佑通寶	嘉佑通宝	Regular script, Seal script	1056–1063	Renzong	
Jia You Yuan Bao	嘉佑元寶	嘉佑元宝	Regular script, Seal script	1056–1063	Renzong	
Zhi Ping Tong Bao	治平通寶	治平通宝	Regular script, Seal script	1064–1067	Yingzong	
Zhi Ping Yuan Bao	治平元寶	治平元宝	Regular script, Seal script	1064–1067	Yingzong	
Xi Ning Tong Bao	熙寧通寶	熙宁通宝	Regular script, Seal script	1068–1077	Shenzong	
Xi Ning Yuan Bao	熙寧元寶	熙宁元宝	Regular script, Seal script	1068–1077	Shenzong	
Xi Ning Zhong Bao	熙寧重寶	熙宁重宝	Regular script, Seal script	1068–1077	Shenzong	
Yuan Feng Tong Bao	元豐通寶	元丰通宝	Regular script, Seal script, Running script	1078–1085	Shenzong	
Yuan You Tong Bao	元佑通寶	元佑通宝	Seal script, Running script	1086–1094	Zhezong	
Shao Sheng Tong Bao	紹聖通寶	绍圣通宝	Regular script, Seal script, Running script	1094–1098	Zhezong	
Shao Sheng Yuan Bao	紹聖元寶	绍圣元宝	Regular script, Seal script, Running script	1094–1098	Zhezong	
Yuan Fu Tong Bao	元符通寶	元符通宝	Regular script, Seal script, Running script	1098–1100	Zhezong	
Jian Guo Tong Bao (Note: These cash coins were cast to celebrate the period title of Jian Zhing Jing Guo which was considered too long to use as an inscription and these cash coins were not made for general circulation. The Jian Guo Tong Bao is notably made from white copper.)	建國通寶	建国通宝	Regular script, Seal script	1101	Huizong	
Sheng Song Tong Bao	聖宋通寶	圣宋通宝	Regular script, Seal script	1101–1106	Huizong	
Sheng Song Yuan Bao	聖宋元寶	圣宋元宝	Clerical script, Seal script, Running script	1101–1106	Huizong	
Chong Ning Tong Bao	崇寧通寶	崇宁通宝	Regular script	1102–1106	Huizong	
Chong Ning Yuan Bao	崇寧元寶	崇宁元宝	Regular script	1102–1106	Huizong	
Chong Ning Zhong Bao	崇寧重寶	崇宁重宝	Regular script	1102–1106	Huizong	
Da Guan Tong Bao	大觀通寶	大观通宝	Regular script	1107–1110	Huizong	
Zheng He Tong Bao	政和通寶	政和通宝	Regular script, Seal script	1111–1117	Huizong	
Chong He Tong Bao	重和通寶	重和通宝	Regular script, Seal script	1118–1119	Huizong	
Xuan He Tong Bao	宣和通寶	宣和通宝	Regular script, Seal script	1119–1125	Huizong	
Xuan He Yuan Bao	宣和元寶	宣和元宝	Regular script, Seal script	1119–1125	Huizong	
Jing Kang Tong Bao	靖康通寶	靖康通宝	Regular script, Seal script	1126–1127	Qinzong	
Jing Kang Yuan Bao	靖康元寶	靖康元宝	Regular script, Seal script	1126–1127	Qinzong	

=== Southern Song dynasty cash coins ===
Inscription	Traditional Chinese	Simplified Chinese	Scripts	Period minted	Emperor	Image
Jianyan Tongbao	建炎通寶	建炎通宝	Regular script, Seal script	1127–1130	Gaozong	
Jianyan Yuanbao	建炎元寶	建炎元宝	Regular script, Seal script	1127–1130	Gaozong	
Jianyan Zhongbao	建炎重寶	建炎重宝	Seal script	1127–1130	Gaozong	
Shaoxing Tongbao	紹興通寶	绍兴通宝	Regular script, Seal script	1131–1162	Gaozong	
Shaoxing Yuanbao	紹興元寶	绍兴元宝	Regular script	1131–1162	Gaozong	
Longxing Tongbao	隆興通寶	隆兴通宝	Regular script, Seal script	1163–1164	Xiaozong	
Longxing Yuanbao	隆興元寶	隆兴元宝	Regular script, Seal script	1163–1164	Xiaozong	
Qiandao Tongbao	乾道通寶	干道通宝	Regular script	1165–1173	Xiaozong	
Qiandao Yuanbao	乾道元寶	干道元宝	Regular script	1165–1173	Xiaozong	
Chunxi Tongbao	淳熙通寶	淳熙通宝	Regular script	1174–1189	Xiaozong	
Chunxi Yuanbao	淳熙元寶	淳熙元宝	Regular script, Seal script	1174–1189	Xiaozong	
Shaoxi Tongbao	紹熙通寶	绍熙通宝	Regular script, Seal script	1190–1194	Guangzong	
Shaoxi Yuanbao	紹熙元寶	绍熙元宝	Regular script, Seal script	1190–1194	Guangzong	
Qingyuan Tongbao	慶元通寶	庆元通宝	Regular script	1195–1200	Ningzong	
Qingyuan Yuanbao	慶元元寶	庆元元宝	Regular script	1195–1200	Ningzong	
Jiatai Tongbao	嘉泰通寶	嘉泰通宝	Regular script	1201–1204	Ningzong	
Jiatai Yuanbao	嘉泰元寶	嘉泰元宝	Regular script	1201–1204	Ningzong	
Kaixi Tongbao	開禧通寶	开禧通宝	Regular script	1205–1207	Ningzong	
Kaixi Yuanbao	開禧元寶	开禧元宝	Regular script	1205–1207	Ningzong	
Shengsong Yuanbao	聖宋元寶	圣宋元宝	Regular script	1210	Ningzong	
Shengsong Zhongbao	聖宋重寶	圣宋重宝	Regular script	1210	Ningzong	
Jiading Tongbao	嘉定通寶	嘉定通宝	Regular script	1208–1224	Ningzong	
Jiading Zhongbao	嘉定重寶	嘉定重宝	Regular script, seal script	1208–1224	Ningzong	
Jiading Yuanbao	嘉定元寶	嘉定元宝	Regular script	1208–1224	Ningzong	
Jiading Dabao	嘉定大寶	嘉定大宝	Regular script	1208–1224	Ningzong	
Jiading Chongbao	嘉定崇寶	嘉定崇宝	Regular script	1208–1224	Ningzong	
Jiading Quanbao	嘉定全寶	嘉定全宝	Regular script	1208–1224	Ningzong	
Jiading Yongbao	嘉定永寶	嘉定永宝	Regular script	1208–1224	Ningzong	
Jiading Zhenbao	嘉定真寶	嘉定真宝	Regular script	1208–1224	Ningzong	
Jiading Xinbao	嘉定新寶	嘉定新宝	Regular script	1208–1224	Ningzong	
Jiading Anbao	嘉定安寶	嘉定安宝	Regular script	1208–1224	Ningzong	
Jiading Longbao	嘉定隆寶	嘉定隆宝	Regular script	1208–1224	Ningzong	
Jiading Quanbao	嘉定泉寶	嘉定泉宝	Regular script	1208–1224	Ningzong	
Jiading Zhengbao	嘉定正寶	嘉定正宝	Regular script	1208–1224	Ningzong	
Jiading Hongbao	嘉定洪寶	嘉定洪宝	Regular script	1208–1224	Ningzong	
Jiading Wanbao	嘉定万寶	嘉定万宝	Regular script	1208–1224	Ningzong	
Jiading Zhibao	嘉定之寶	嘉定之宝	Regular script	1208–1224	Ningzong	
Jiading Zhenbao	嘉定珍寶	嘉定珍宝	Regular script	1208–1224	Ningzong	
Jiading Xingbao	嘉定興寶	嘉定兴宝	Regular script	1208–1224	Ningzong	
Jiading Yongbao	嘉定用寶	嘉定用宝	Regular script	1208–1224	Ningzong	
Jiading Zhibao	嘉定至寶	嘉定至宝	Regular script	1208–1224	Ningzong	
Jiading Fengbao	嘉定封寶	嘉定封宝	Regular script	1208–1224	Ningzong	
Baoqing Yuanbao	寶慶元寶	宝庆元宝	Regular script	1225–1227	Lizong	
Dasong Tongbao	大宋通寶	大宋通宝	Regular script	1225	Lizong	
Dasong Yuanbao	大宋元寶	大宋元宝	Regular script	1225–1227	Lizong	
Shaoding Tongbao	紹定通寶	绍定通宝	Regular script	1228–1233	Lizong	
Shaoding Yuanbao	紹定元寶	绍定元宝	Regular script	1228–1233	Lizong	
Duanping Tongbao	端平通寶	端平通宝	Regular script	1234–1236	Lizong	
Duanping Yuanbao	端平元寶	端平元宝	Regular script	1234–1236	Lizong	
Duanping Zhongbao	端平重寶	端平重宝	Regular script	1234–1236	Lizong	
Jiaxi Tongbao	嘉熙通寶	嘉熙通宝	Regular script	1237–1240	Lizong	
Jiaxi Zhongbao	嘉熙重寶	嘉熙重宝	Regular script	1237–1240	Lizong	
Chunyou Tongbao	淳佑通寶	淳佑通宝	Regular script	1241–1252	Lizong	
Chunyou Yuanbao	淳佑元寶	淳佑元宝	Regular script	1241–1252	Lizong	
Huangsong Yuanbao	皇宋元寶	皇宋元宝	Regular script	1253–1258	Lizong	
Kaiqing Tongbao	開慶通寶	开庆通宝	Regular script	1259	Lizong	
Jingding Yuanbao	景定元寶	景定元宝	Regular script	1260–1264	Lizong	
Xianchun Yuanbao	咸淳元寶	咸淳元宝	Regular script	1265–1274	Duzong	

== List of Qian Pai by inscription ==
List of Qian Pai (錢牌) variants by inscription
Obverse inscription (Traditional Chinese)	Reverse inscription (Traditional Chinese)	Translation	Composition	Hartill number(s)	Image
Lin'an Fu Xing Yong (臨安府行用)	Zhun Yi Shi Wen Sheng (準壹拾文省)	"(For) use in Lin'An Prefecture." "Equal to 10 cash coins reduced."	Lead	17.900	
Lin'an Fu Xing Yong (臨安府行用)	Zhun Er Shi Wen Sheng (準貳拾文省)	"(For) use in Lin'An Prefecture." "Equal to 20 cash coins reduced."	Lead	None	
Lin'an Fu Xing Yong (臨安府行用)	Zhun Si Shi Wen Sheng (準肆拾文省)	"(For) use in Lin'An Prefecture." "Equal to 40 cash coins reduced."	Lead	17.901	
Lin'an Fu Xing Yong (臨安府行用)	Zhun Yi Bai Wen Sheng (準壹佰文省)	"(For) use in Lin'An Prefecture." "Equal to 100 cash coins reduced."	Lead	17.902	
Lin'an Fu Xing Yong (臨安府行用)	Zhun Er Bai Wen Sheng (準貳佰文省)	"(For) use in Lin'An Prefecture." "Equal to 200 cash coins reduced."	Bronze	17.903, 17.904	
Lin'an Fu Xing Yong (臨安府行用)	Zhun San Bai Wen Sheng (準三佰文省)	"(For) use in Lin'An Prefecture." "Equal to 300 cash coins reduced"	Bronze	17.905, 17.906	
Lin'an Fu Xing Yong (臨安府行用)	Zhun Wu Bai Wen Sheng (準伍佰文省)	"(For) use in Lin'An Prefecture" "Equal to 500 cash coins reduced."	Bronze	17.907, 17.908	
He Zhou Xing Yong, Shi Wen Bai (和州行用，十文百)	Zhun Xuan, Zhun Shi Ba Jie Er Bai (權宣，準拾捌界貳佰)	"(For) use in He Prefecture, 10 pieces [equivalent to] 100." "For emergency use, equal to 18 with a limit of 200."	Lead	17.909	
He Zhou Xing Yong, Shi Bai (和州行用，使百)	Zhun Xuan, Zhun Shi Ba Jie Er Bai (權宣，準拾捌界貳佰)	"(For) use in He Prefecture, use as 100." "For emergency use, equal to 18 with a limit of 200."	Bronze	17.910	
Zhun Shi Ba Jie Yi Bai Jiang Zhou Xing Shi (準拾捌界壹佰江州行使)	Shi [Unknown] (使 [Unknown])	"Equal to 18 with a limit of 100. [For] Jiang prefecture use." "Use as [Unreadable]."	Bronze	17.191	

== Mintage figures and money supply ==
=== Bronze cash coins ===
Bronze cash coins were produced is large amounts in the prior era of the Song, this can be partially explained due to population growth as the population grew from at least 32.000.000 people in 961 to at most 120.000.000 in 1193. For example, during the reign of Emperor Taizong 800.000 strings (or 800.000.000 cash coins) were cast, while during the reign of Emperor Yingzong the annual production rose to 3.000.000 strings.

By the time of the Jingkang incident the government of the Song dynasty had accumulated 98.000.000 strings, and that 30.000.000 strings circulated among people. This indicated that while a large number of cash coins were being produced during the Northern Song dynasty period, only some of them reached general circulation among the people. Even if the number of cash coins in strings was only around 800 per string, the total number of Song dynasty cash coins that was produced by the end of Song dynasty period would be around 90.000.000.000. However, an even larger number of cash coins was likely cast due to the fact that the currency of the Song dynasty had become the universal currency of the Far East at the time and a large number of cash coins was exported.

Meanwhile, the annual output of cash coins had greatly declined during the Southern Song dynasty period reaching only an average of 200.000 strings per year and often far less, this was due to a combination of both high minting costs and high mining costs. The copper shortage was so bad that it became a frequent event for the emperor to issue edicts demanding that private citizens would deliver all their copper-alloy utensils and other possessions to the mints. The copper shortage also meant that, compared to the cash coins of the Northern Song dynasty period, the Southern Song coinage contained 25% less copper.

The success of Northern Song dynasty cash coins domestically and internationally made it difficult, even at peak production, to produce a sufficient number of coins for the market, and to restore the elasticity of the money supply the government issued paper money to secure the payment of taxes.

=== Iron cash coins ===
Iron cash coins played an important role during the Song dynasty period and approximately 900.000.000 iron cash coins were produced annually. In 1080 there were 26 mints, 9 of them produced iron cash coins.

Most iron cash coins circulated in the south alongside bronze cash coins, but during the Southern Song dynasty period their circulation was supplemented with paper money alleviating the issues caused by the regional copper shortage. Meaning that while iron cash coins still circulated there during the Southern Song period, they were no longer as important as they were during the Northern Song period.

== Cash coins issued for Jin Army defectors ==
In the year Shaoxing 1 (1131) the military forces of the Song and Jurchen Jin dynasties were encamped opposite to each other on each side of the Yangtze River, General Liu Guangshi (劉光世) created a special cash coin-like "trust token" with the inscription Zhaona Xinbao (招納信寶) which could be translated as "Treasure (coin) that recruits (Jin dynasty) soldiers who desire to return to their home" and adopted a policy that these special cash coins could be used to show that their defection from the Jin Army. The soldiers who deserted didn't only include ethnic Han Chinese but also included Khitans and Jurchens. These additional soldiers were organised into two newly created armies named the "Read Hearts" (赤心, chì xīn) and the "Army Appearing from Nowhere" (奇兵, qí bīng). The enormous number of deserters forced the Jin general Wan Yanchang (完顏昌) to call for his remaining troops to retreat.

Inscription	Traditional Chinese	Simplified Chinese	Image
Zhaona Xinbao (obverse); Shi Shang (reverse)	招納信寶 (obverse) 使上 (reverse)	招纳信宝 (obverse) 使上 (reverse)	

== Contemporary coin books ==
In the year 1149 the Quan Zhi (泉志) was written by Hong Zun (洪遵), which is recognised as the world's oldest extant coin book. The Quan Zhi annotated the various forms of Chinese currency from ancient China to the Song dynasty period.

== Fantasy inscriptions ==
While no cash coins were cast by the final three emperors of the Song dynasty with the dynastic titles, or reign era dates, of Deyou (德佑), Jingyan (景炎), and Xiangxing (祥興), both in the past and in order to meet the demand for such Southern Song dynasty era cash coins by avid coin collectors, a small number of unscrupulous ancient Chinese coin dealers manufactured fantasy Deyou and Jingyan cash coins for their own profits.

There exists a diminutive, thin cash coin with the Xiangxing inscription, but this specific cash coin was manufactured in what is today Vietnam and is not associated with the coinage of the Southern Song dynasty (see: Vietnamese cash).

== See also ==
- Cash (Chinese coin)
- Chinese cash (currency unit)
- History of Chinese currency
- Jin dynasty coinage (1115–1234)
- Liao dynasty coinage
- Ming dynasty coinage
- Qing dynasty coinage
- Western Xia coinage
- Yuan dynasty coinage
- Zhou dynasty coinage

== Sources ==
- Hartill, David (2005). Cast Chinese Coins: A Historical Catalogue. Trafford. ISBN 978-1-4120-5466-9.
- von Glahn, Richard (1996). Fountain of Fortune. Money and Monetary Policy in China, 1000-1700. University of California Press.

Preceded by: Ancient Chinese coinage Reason: Jurchen conquest of Northern China.	Currency of Southern China; 1127 – 1279	Succeeded by: Yuan dynasty coinage Reason: Mongol conquest of the Song dynasty.
