= Nine-fold seal script =

Stylised, rectilinear, folded form of Chinese calligraphy

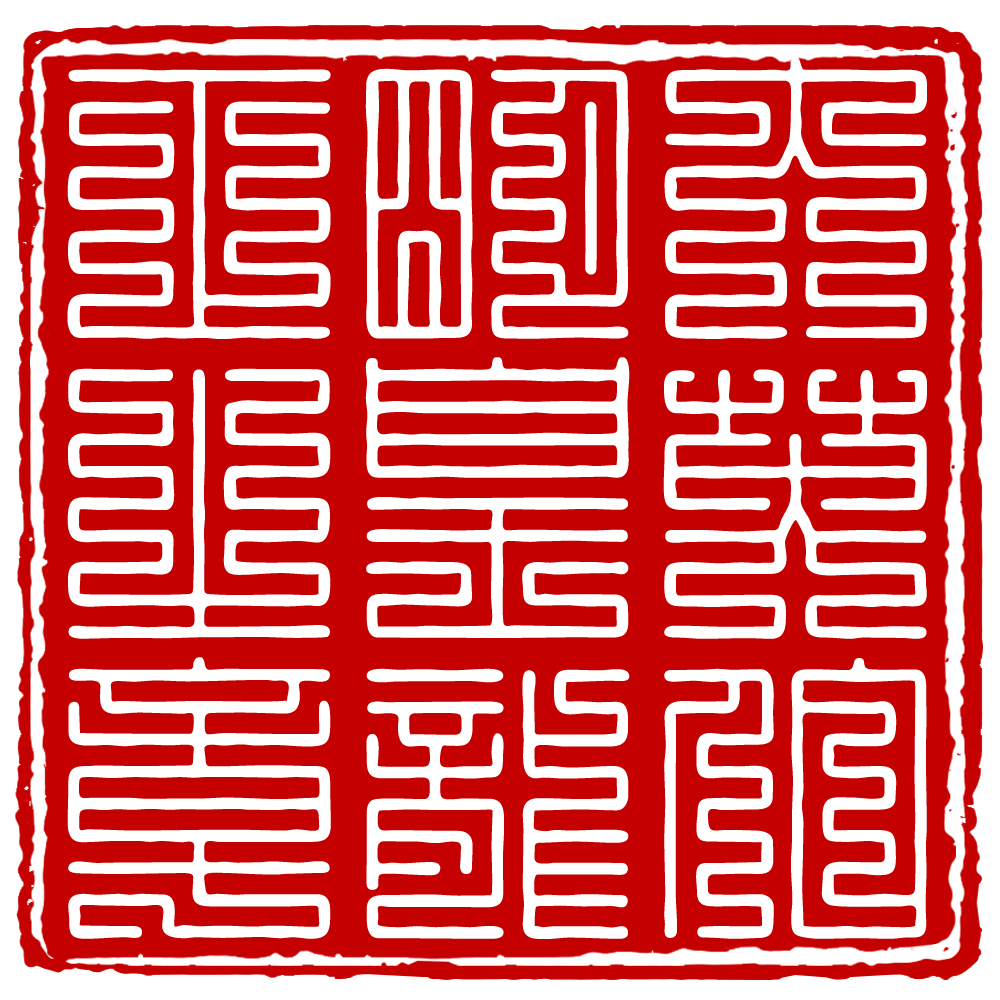
- A seal impression bearing the text "大英伯朙𦤃龍正㞢章" (modern: "大英伯明皇龍正之章") in nine-fold seal script
- Script type: Logographic
- Period: Song dynasty onwards
- Languages: Middle Chinese

Related scripts
- Parent systems: Oracle bone script: Bronze script; Small seal script; Nine-fold seal script

Nine-fold seal script (Note: simplified Chinese: 九叠篆; traditional Chinese: 九疊篆; pinyin: jiǔ dié zhuàn) or nine-fold script (Note: simplified Chinese: 九叠文; traditional Chinese: 九疊文; pinyin: jiǔ dié wén; or simplified Chinese: 九叠书; traditional Chinese: 九疊書; pinyin: jiǔ dié shū) (also jiudiezhuan or jiudiewen; nine-bend script; or layered script) is a highly stylised form of Chinese calligraphy derived from small seal script, using convoluted winding strokes aligned to horizontal and vertical directions, folded back and forth to fill the available space. It was used for Chinese characters on official seals by the Song dynasty and the contemporaneous Liao dynasty, as well as by later dynasties such as the Ming dynasty. It is encountered mainly on official governmental seals, but occasionally seen in other contexts, such as the seals of Daoist masters.

== Form and terminology ==
Strokes are conformed to the horizontal and vertical directions. As the name suggests, the strokes of a character are "folded" or "stacked" back on themselves, such as to fill the available space. This creates a rhythmic, layered or spiralling, visual effect.

Depending on the complexity of the character and space constraints of the seal face, however, the number of "fold" layers did not always equal nine, but could be as few as six or as many as sixteen. Although the term "nine-fold seal script" in a broad sense includes these variations, such examples are sometimes referred to simply as "folded/layered seal script", (Note: simplified Chinese: 叠篆; traditional Chinese: 疊篆; pinyin: dié zhuàn) or by specific terms such as "eight-fold seal script". (Note: simplified Chinese: 八叠篆; traditional Chinese: 八疊篆; pinyin: bā dié zhuàn)

== History ==
Nine-fold seal script was developed during the Song dynasty (960–1279). The contemporaneous Khitan Liao dynasty adopted it for Chinese-language seals, and also adapted it for the Khitan large script for use on Khitan-language seals. The Western Xia dynasty also developed a seal-script form of the Tangut script inspired by the nine-fold seal script.

One of the earliest examples of folded seal script is the "Seal of the Inner Court Library" used by the court of Emperor Huizong of Song (reigned 1100–1126) on artworks in the imperial collection.

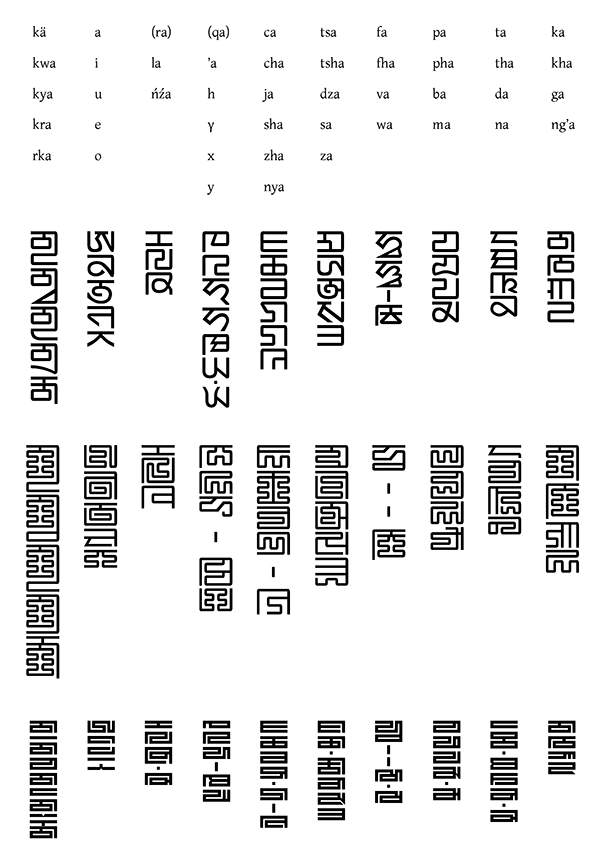
Third from top: the seal script style of Phags-pa, influenced by Chinese nine-fold seal script

The influence of nine-fold seal script continued during the remainder of the Imperial Chinese period; for example, it was used in Ming dynasty governmental seals. The Mongol-led Yuan dynasty developed a seal-script form of Phags-pa influenced by Chinese nine-fold seal script, and the Manchu-led Qing dynasty did the same for the Manchu script.

== See also ==
- Bannai script
- Seal script
- Space-filling curve
- Square Kufic (a similar Arabic script)
