= Shinoridate =

Former fort in Hakodate, Hokkaidō, Japan

- 志苔館跡 (Japanese)
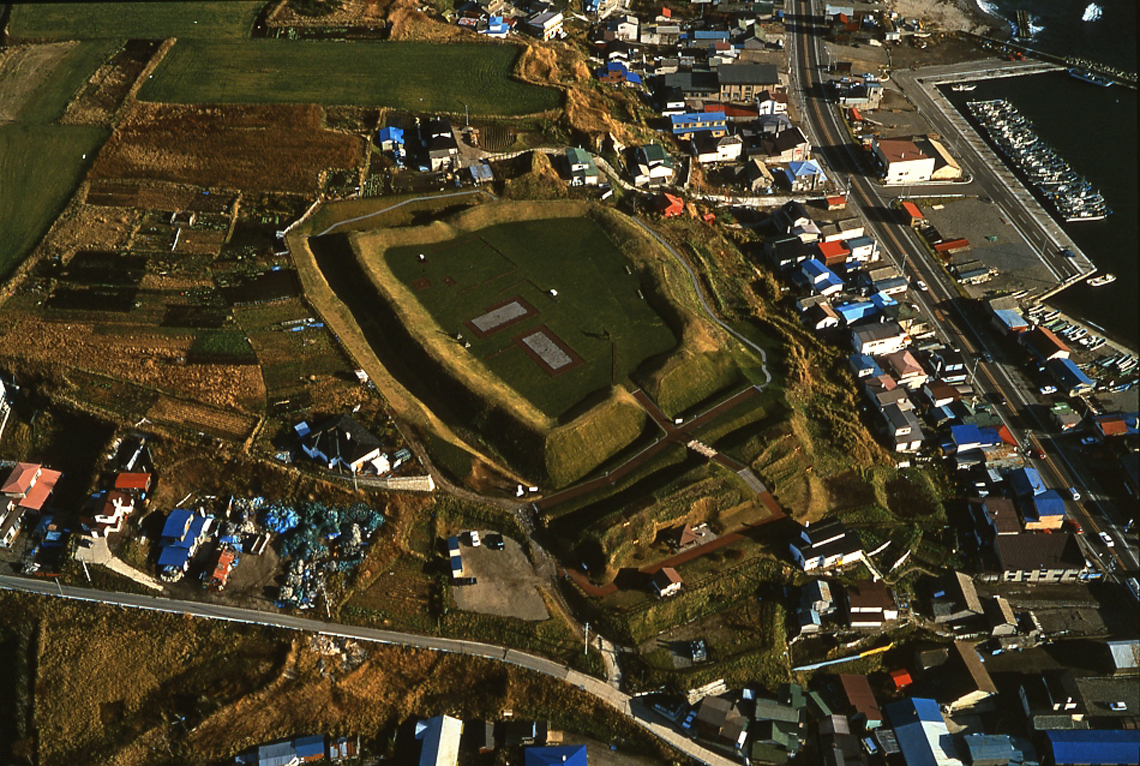
- Aerial view (courtesy of Hakodate City)

- Location within Hokkaido Location within Japan
- 41°45′57″N 140°49′20″E
- Type: Fortified residence
- Location: Hakodate, Hokkaidō, Japan

Site notes
- Elevation: 17 to 25 m (56 to 82 ft)
- Length: 50 to 65 metres (164 to 213 ft)
- Width: 70 to 80 metres (230 to 260 ft)
- Area: 4,100 square metres (44,000 sq ft) (enclosure); 19,960.14 square metres (214,849.2 sq ft) (Historic Site)
- Owner: National Historic Site
- Public access: Yes

The site of Shinoridate (志苔館跡, Shinoridate ato) in Hakodate, Hokkaidō, Japan, is that once occupied by the Shinori Fort or Fortified Residence (as denoted by the tate or date ending). This was the easternmost of the so-called "Twelve Garrisons of Southern Hokkaido", built on the Oshima Peninsula by the Wajin from the fourteenth century. The site was designated a National Historic Site in 1934 and is one of the Japan Castle Foundation's Continued Top 100 Japanese Castles.

== Shinori fort ==
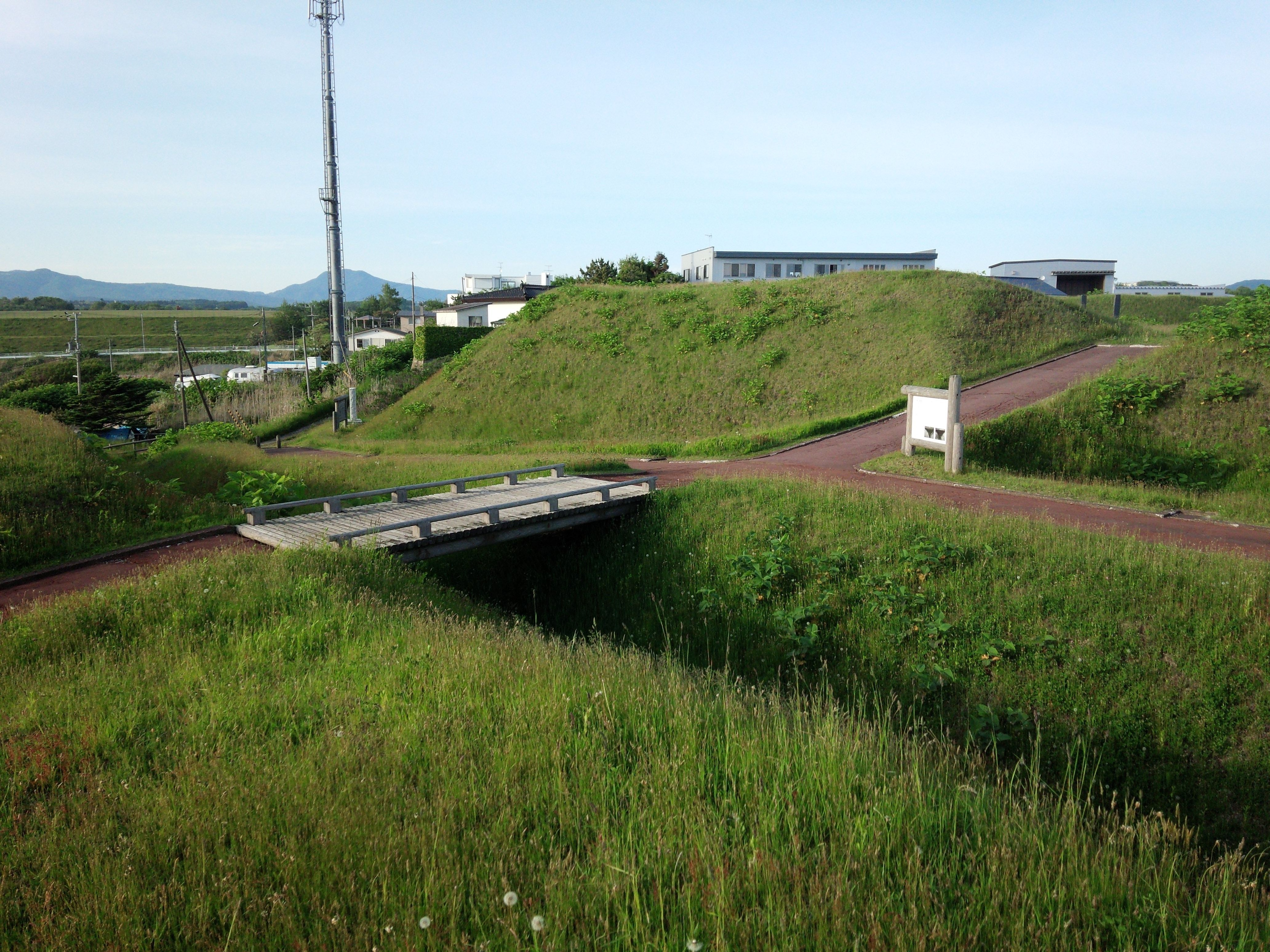
Moat and earthen wall of Shinoridate

Of the Twelve Garrisons of Donan (道南十二館), Mobetsu and Hanazawa alone held out against Koshamain's forces in 1457; clockwise from Shinori at the east end: Usukeshi (宇須岸館), Mobetsu (茂別館), Nakano (中野館), Wakimoto (脇本館), Innai (穏内館), Oyobe (覃部館), Ōdate (大館), Nebota (禰保田館), Haraguchi (原口館), Hiishi (比石館), and Hanazawa (花沢館)

Shinoridate is located some 9 kilometres (5.6 mi) to the east of the center of Hakodate, along a stretch of coast with many good natural harbours. A short distance inland from Shinori Fishing Port, with the mouth of the Shinori River to the west, the gently sloping site overlooks the Tsugaru Strait and Shimokita Peninsula, with views also towards Mount Hakodate.

The earthworks rise to a height of 4 to 4.5 metres (13 to 15 ft) on the north side and 1 to 1.5 metres (3.3 to 4.9 ft) to the south and are interrupted by an opening on both the east and the west sides. The moat is 5 to 10 metres (16 to 33 ft) wide on the north and west sides and up to 3.5 metres (11 ft) deep and is crossed by two earth bridges, that to the west particularly well-preserved.

First laid out around the end of the fourteenth century, Shinoridate features in the Matsumae Domainal history Shinra no Kiroku, which tells of it being sacked by the Ainu in Chōroku 1 (1457), during Koshamain's War, and again falling to the Ainu in Eishō 9 (1512), after which its occupants, the house of Kobayashi (小林氏), became subject to the Matsumae clan. (Note: 「長禄元年五月十四日夷狄蜂起来而、攻撃志濃里之舘主小林太郎左衛門尉良景…殺狄之酋長胡奢魔允」("On the fourteenth day of the fifth month of the first year of the Chōroku era (1457), a barbarian uprising occurred, and in an attack on Shinori Fort, its lord Kobayashi Tarō Saemon-no-jō Yoshikage...was killed, the barbarian tribal leader being Koshamain") 「永正九年四月十六日宇須岸志濃利與倉前三舘所攻落夷賊…小林太郎左衛門尉良景之子彌太郎良定」("On the sixteenth day of the fourth month of the ninth year of the Eishō era (1512), the three forts of Usukeshi, Shinori, and Yokuramae fell in an attack by barbarian bandits and...Kobayashi Tarō Saemon-no-jō Yoshikage's son Yatarō Yoshisada was killed"))

The Hakodate City Board of Education conducted excavations and surveys of the enclosure and surrounding area between 1983 and 1985, uncovering the remains of a number of buildings, palisades, a well, artefacts made of bronze, iron, stone, and wood, celadons and white porcelain from southern China, as well as domestic Suzu, Echizen, and Seto ware.

Three different intercolumnar measurements were used in the construction of the buildings, the style of the well is that found in Heian-kyō in the late Kamakura period, while many of the ceramics are typical of the early fifteenth century.

Accordingly, three main phases have been identified: the end of the fourteenth or early-fifteenth century; mid-fifteenth century; and sixteenth century or later. With the archaeological evidence pushing back the origins of the fort at least half a century before Koshamain, its construction can no longer be understood as an immediate response to the contingencies of 1457, and other explanations are required.

== Shinori hoard ==
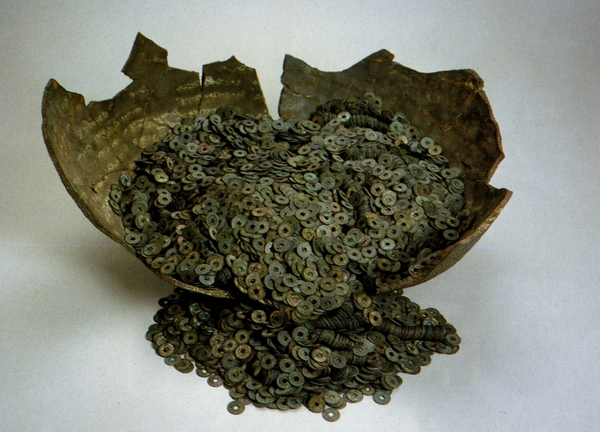
Suzu ware vessel with part of the hoard (courtesy of Hakodate City); the other two vessels were from the Echizen kilns

In July 1968, during widening work on the prefectural road (now National Route 278) that runs past the fort, a Nanbokuchō-period (C14) coin hoard was unearthed some 40 metres (130 ft) inland from the mouth of the Shinori River, at a location 3 metres (9.8 ft) above sea level. This is the largest hoard found to date in Japan in terms of the number of coins it contains.

The three large vessels excavated weighed, together with their contents, 1.6 tonnes (1.6 long tons; 1.8 short tons). Ninety-three different types of coin have been identified: a handful in total of early Japanese coinage of the Asuka, Nara and early Heian periods, late tenth-century Vietnamese coinage of the Đinh and Early Lê dynasties, and late eleventh-century Goryeo coinage from Korea; the bulk comprising Chinese coinage, primarily of the Song dynasty, issues ranging in date from 4 Zhu Ban Liang minted in the fifth year of Emperor Wen of Han (175 BC) to Hongwu Tongbao from the first year of the Hongwu Emperor, founder of the Ming dynasty (1368). The 374,435 coins from this hoard now at the Hakodate City Museum have been designated an Important Cultural Property.

A 1999 study of 275 Japanese hoards, totalling 3,530,000 coins, found that the Chinese copper coins used in Japan in the Middle Ages were brought over in the largest number in the thirteenth century, were used primarily in commerce or for paying soldiers, and were buried largely for reasons of security, although there were also instances of ritual or votive deposits. The dating of the Shinori hoard precludes its burial as a response to Koshamain's War; instead it may relate to trade, the local Shinori or Kaga kombu featuring alongside Ezo salmon in the Nanboku-chō period text Teikin Ōrai (庭訓往来). Produce from the area would have been traded along the Hokuriku coast to reach the markets of Kyōto and Ōsaka.

Coins in the Shinori hoard
	Type	Date/First minted	Quantity	Origin
1	4 Zhu Ban Liang	175 BC (Buntei 5)	7	Han
2	Wu Zhu	115 BC (Gentei 2)	39	Han
3	Huo Quan	14 (Tenpō 1)	6	Xin
4	Kaiyuan Tongbao	621	30,816	Tang
5	Qian Yuan Zhong Bao	758 (Kengen 1)	1,422	Tang
6	Wadōkaichin	708	1	Asuka period
7	Mannen Tsūhō	760	1	Nara period
8	Jinkō Kaihō	765	4	Nara period
9	Ryūhei Eihō	796	2	Heian period
10	Fuju Shinpō	818	4	Heian period
11	Jōwa Shōhō	835	1	Heian period
12	Jōgan Eihō	870	1	Heian period
13	Engi Tsuhō	907	1	Heian period
14	Tong Zheng Yuan Bao	915	8	Former Shu
15	Tian Han Yuan Bao	917	17	Former Shu
16	Guang Tian Yuan Bao	918	17	Former Shu
17	Qian De Yuan Bao	919	79	Former Shu
18	Xian Kang Yuan Bao	925	19	Former Shu
19	Da Tang Tong Bao	944	2	Southern Tang
20	Han Yuan Tong Bao	948	15	Later Han
21	Zhou Yuan Tong Bao	955	87	Later Zhou
22	Tang Guo Tong Bao	959	393	Southern Tang
23	Song Yuan Tong Bao	960	1,288	Northern Song
24	Thái Bình Hưng Bảo	970	3	Đinh dynasty
25	Tai Ping Tong Bao	976	3,512	Northern Song
26	Thiên Phúc Trấn Bảo	984	19	Early Lê
27	Chun Hua Yuan Bao	990	3,258	Northern Song
28	Zhi Dao Yuan Bao	995	5,851	Northern Song
29	Xian Ping Yuan Bao	998	6,400	Northern Song
30	Jing De Yuan Bao	1004	8,139	Northern Song
31	Xiang Fu Yuan Bao	1008	9,322	Northern Song
32	Xiang Fu Tong Bao	1008	5,384	Northern Song
33	Tian Xi Tong Bao	1017	7,943	Northern Song
34	Tian Sheng Yuan Bao	1023	17,924	Northern Song
35	Ming Dao Yuan Bao	1032	1,813	Northern Song
36	Jing You Yuan Bao	1034	5,384	Northern Song
37	Huang Song Tong Bao	1039	47,031	Northern Song
38	Qing Li Zhong Bao	1045	1	Northern Song
39	Qing Ning Tong Bao	1055	1	Liao
40	Zhi He Yuan Bao	1054	4,452	Northern Song
41	Zhi He Tong Bao	1054	1,416	Northern Song
42	Jia You Yuan Bao	1056	4,478	Northern Song
43	Jia You Tong Bao	1056	8,729	Northern Song
44	Zhi Ping Yuan Bao	1064	7,002	Northern Song
45	Zhi Ping Tong Bao	1064	1,154	Northern Song
46	Xian Yong Tong Bao	1065	2	Liao
47	Xi Ning Yuan Bao	1068	34,897	Northern Song
48	Xi Ning Zhong Bao	1071	12	Northern Song
49	Da Kang Tong Bao	1075	2	Liao
50	Yuan Feng Tong Bao	1078	43,009	Northern Song
51	Yuan You Tong Bao	1086	33,904	Northern Song
52	Shao Sheng Yuan Bao	1094	14,917	Northern Song
53	Shao Sheng Tong Bao	1094	2	Northern Song
54	Dong Guk Tong Bo	1097	7	Goryeo
55	Dong Guk Chung Bo	1097	2	Goryeo
56	Hae Dong Tong Bo	1097	18	Goryeo
57	Hae Dong Jung Bo	1097	1	Goryeo
58	Sam Han Tong Bo	1097	1	Goryeo
59	Sam Han Jung Bo	1097	2	Goryeo
60	Yuan Fu Tong Bao	1098	5,721	Northern Song
61	Sheng Song Yuan Bao	1101	14,333	Northern Song
62	Chong Ning Tong Bao	1102	3	Northern Song
63	Chong Ning Zhong Bao	1102	2	Northern Song
64	Da Guan Tong Bao	1107	4,230	Northern Song
65	Zheng He Tong Bao	1111	15,206	Northern Song
66	Xuan He Yuan Bao	1119	1	Northern Song
67	Xuan He Tong Bao	1119	1,412	Northern Song
68	Jianyan Tong Bao	1127	88	Southern Song
69	Shaoxing Yuan Bao	1131	149	Southern Song
70	Shaoxing Tong Bao	1131	16	Southern Song
71	Zheng Long Yuan Bao	1158	479	Jin
72	Tian Sheng Yuan Bao	1158	3	Western Xia
73	Longxing Yuan Bao	1163	1	Southern Song
74	Qiandao Yuan Bao	1165	2	Southern Song
75	Chunxi Yuan Bao	1174	2,366	Southern Song
76	Da Ding Tong Bao	1178	22	Jin
77	Shaoxi Yuan Bao	1190	774	Southern Song
78	Qingyuan Tong Bao	1195	938	Southern Song
79	Jiatai Tong Bao	1201	549	Southern Song
80	Kaixi Tong Bao	1205	356	Southern Song
81	Jiading Tong Bao	1208	1,735	Southern Song
82	Dasong Yuan Bao	1225	84	Southern Song
83	Shaoding Tong Bao	1228	614	Southern Song
84	Duanping Yuan Bao	1234	49	Southern Song
85	Jiaxi Tong Bao	1237	161	Southern Song
86	Chunyou Yuan Bao	1241	530	Southern Song
87	Huangsong Yuan Bao	1253	285	Southern Song
88	Kaiqing Tong Bao	1259	20	Southern Song
89	Jingding Yuan Bao	1260	475	Southern Song
90	Xianchun Yuan Bao	1265	583	Southern Song
91	Zhi Da Tong Bao	1310	110	Yuan
92	Zhi Zheng Tong Bao	1341	3	Yuan
93	Hongwu Tongbao	1368	12	Ming
			12,901	Unidentified
Total			374,435	

== See also ==
- List of Historic Sites of Japan (Hokkaidō)
- List of Cultural Properties of Japan - archaeological materials (Hokkaidō)
- Hakodate City Museum
- Shiryōkaku
- Shakushain's revolt
- Chashi
- Kitamaebune
- National Ainu Museum
