= Zhou dynasty coinage =

Historical coinage of China

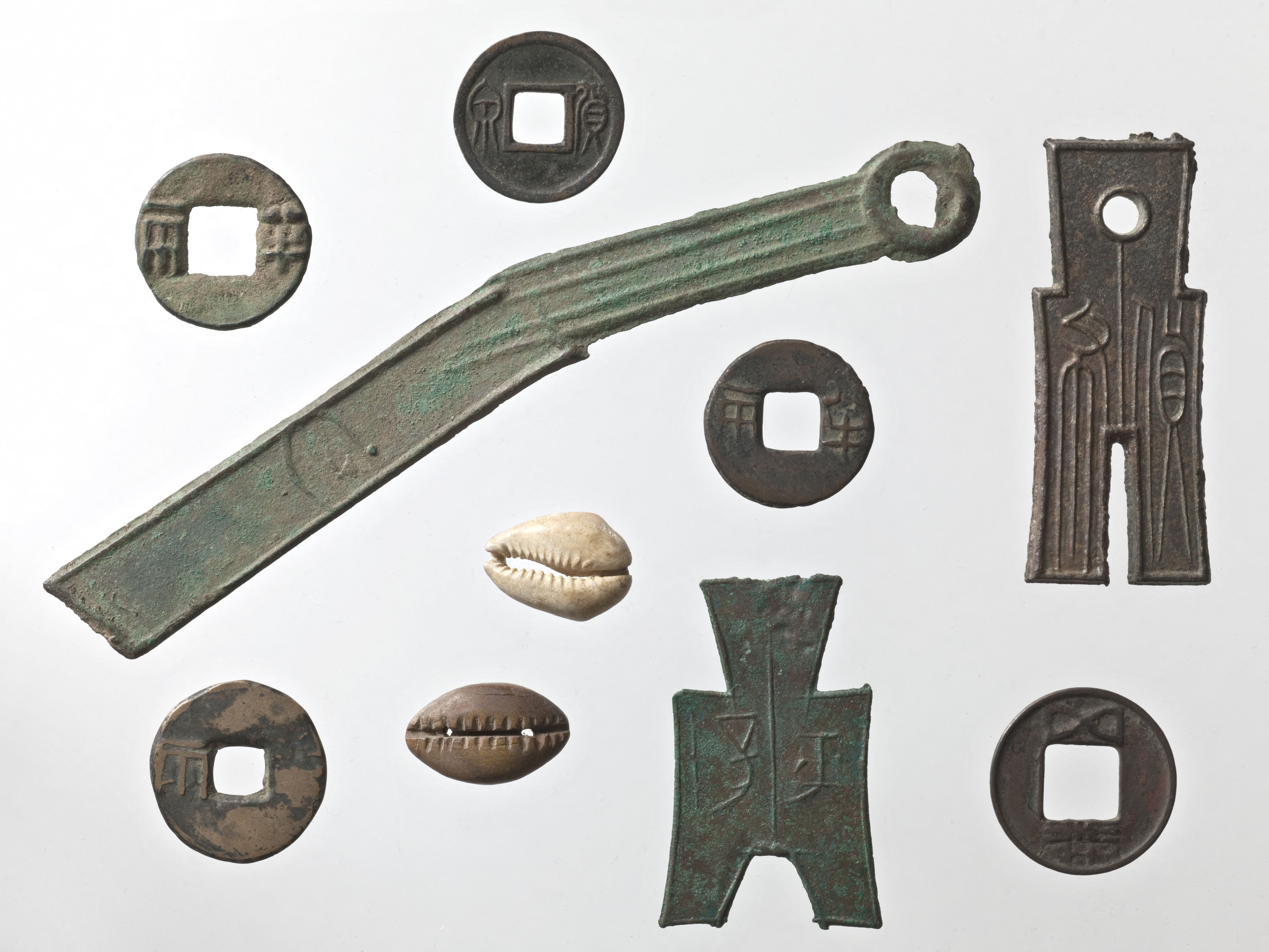
Different types of Zhou dynasty coinage. Musée Cernuschi

Chinese coinage during the Spring and Autumn and Warring States periods includes some of the earliest coins produced in the world. However, they were mostly not the typical round shape of modern coins. They included cowrie shells, ant nose money, spade-shaped money and knife-shaped money.

== Cowrie shell ==
Before the Spring and Autumn period, during the Shang dynasty, cowrie shells had been used as an early type of money. In the Zhou period, their use became more stylised with replica shells made of porcelain, jade or metal coming into use. Some sources suggest that early round coins were a highly stylised representation of the cowrie shells.

== Gold money ==
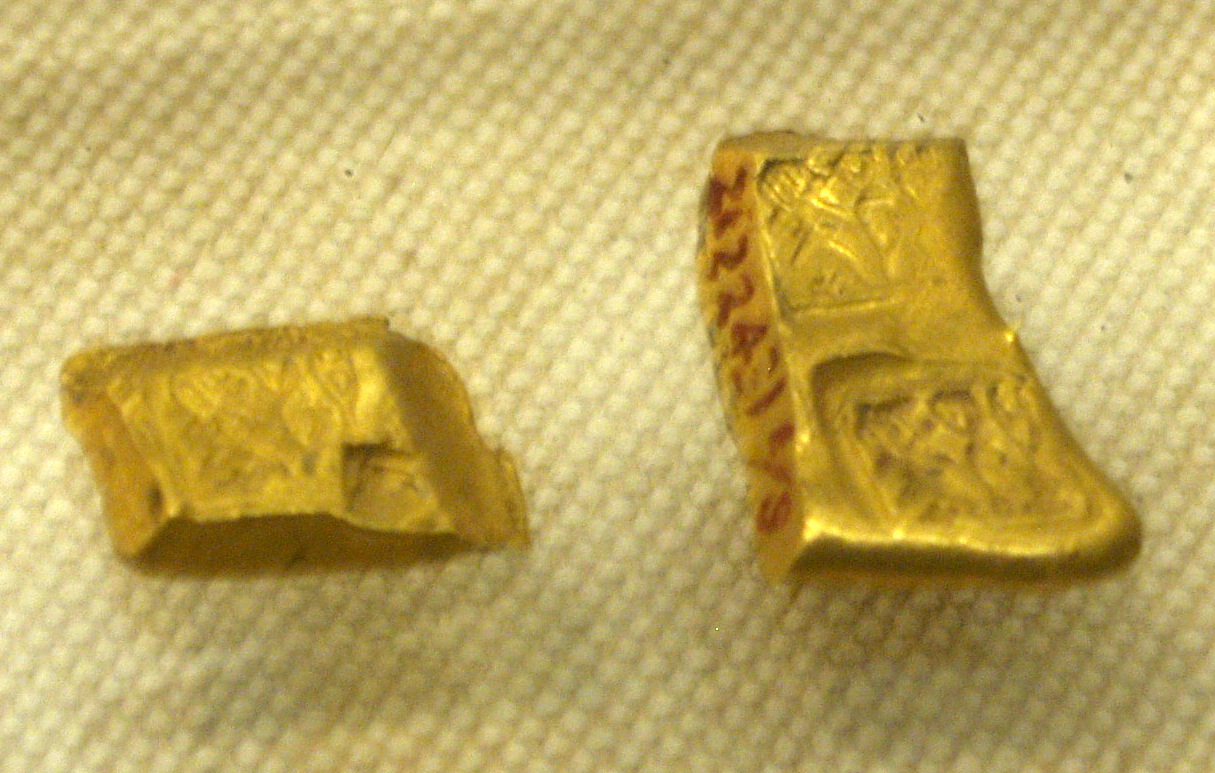
Gold coins marked with "Ying Yuan". "Ying" being the name of the Chu capital.

The State of Chu produced rough squares of gold, stamped with one or two characters which were used as money. In Chinese they are known as Ying Yuan (Chinese: 郢爰; pinyin: yǐng yuán).

== Spade money ==
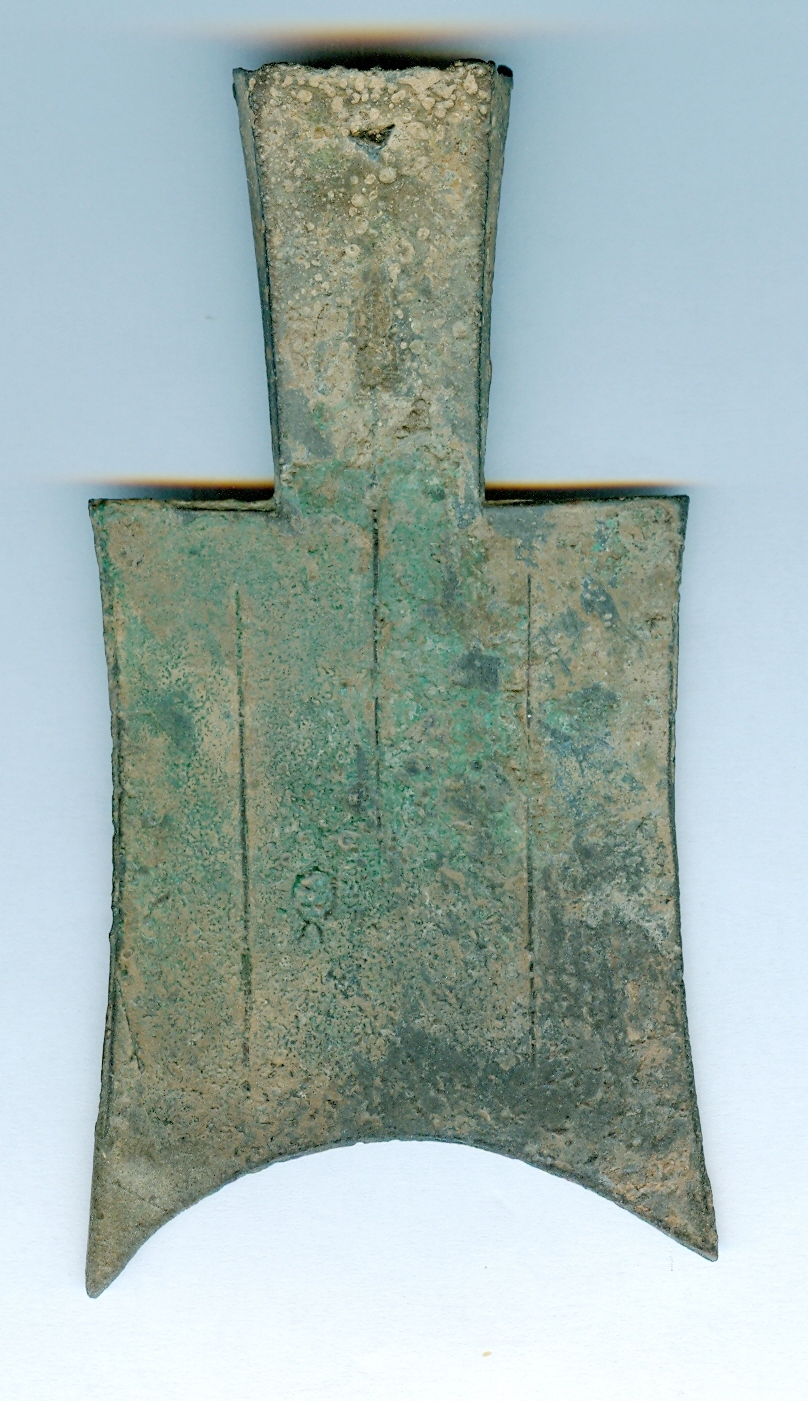
Spade money

The shape of spade money (Chinese: 布币; pinyin: bù bì) is similar to spade, an agricultural tool. The pronunciation of "spade" in Chinese is "bo" (Chinese: 镈; pinyin: bó), which is very close to "bu" (Chinese: 布; pinyin: bù), and it is where spade money derived its name. During the Spring and Autumn period, spade money was used mainly in Shanxi and Zhou royal family. There are two primary types of spade money, Kong Shou Bu (空首布), the early one, and Ping Shou Bu (Chinese: 平首布; pinyin: Píng shǒu bù), the late one. During the currency process, each kingdom had developed their techniques for producing money with the great growth of the national economy. As a result, big changes had taken place in spade money, from big and thick one to small and thin one.

Spade money began to be used in the Spring and Autumn period and ended in the late Warring States. Today, there are few remaining and it has become the emphasis of collectors.

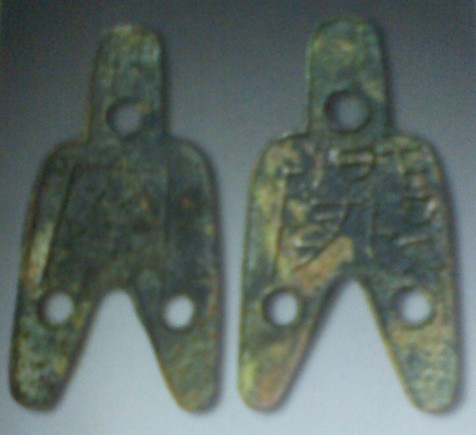
Three-hole spade money

Zhongshan kingdom (Chinese: 中山国; pinyin: zhōngshān guó) (nearly in the 4th century BC), a small vassal state in the mid-Warring States period, first invented and used the early three-hole spade money (Chinese: 三孔布币; pinyin: sān kǒng bù bì), whose contour looked like a mountain. At that time, the handicraft industry, business, iron-smelting industry and bronze casting industry in that kingdom were developed. Usually, people threaded the money together through these holes, which made it easier for people to carry, more convenient for the money to circulate. As a result, the three-hole spade money was well received among people at that time. Due to continuous wars, Zhongshan kingdom fell down and most of the three-hole spade money got lost. Today, there are few left and we can hardly find even in some nationalized large-scale museums.

== Knife money ==
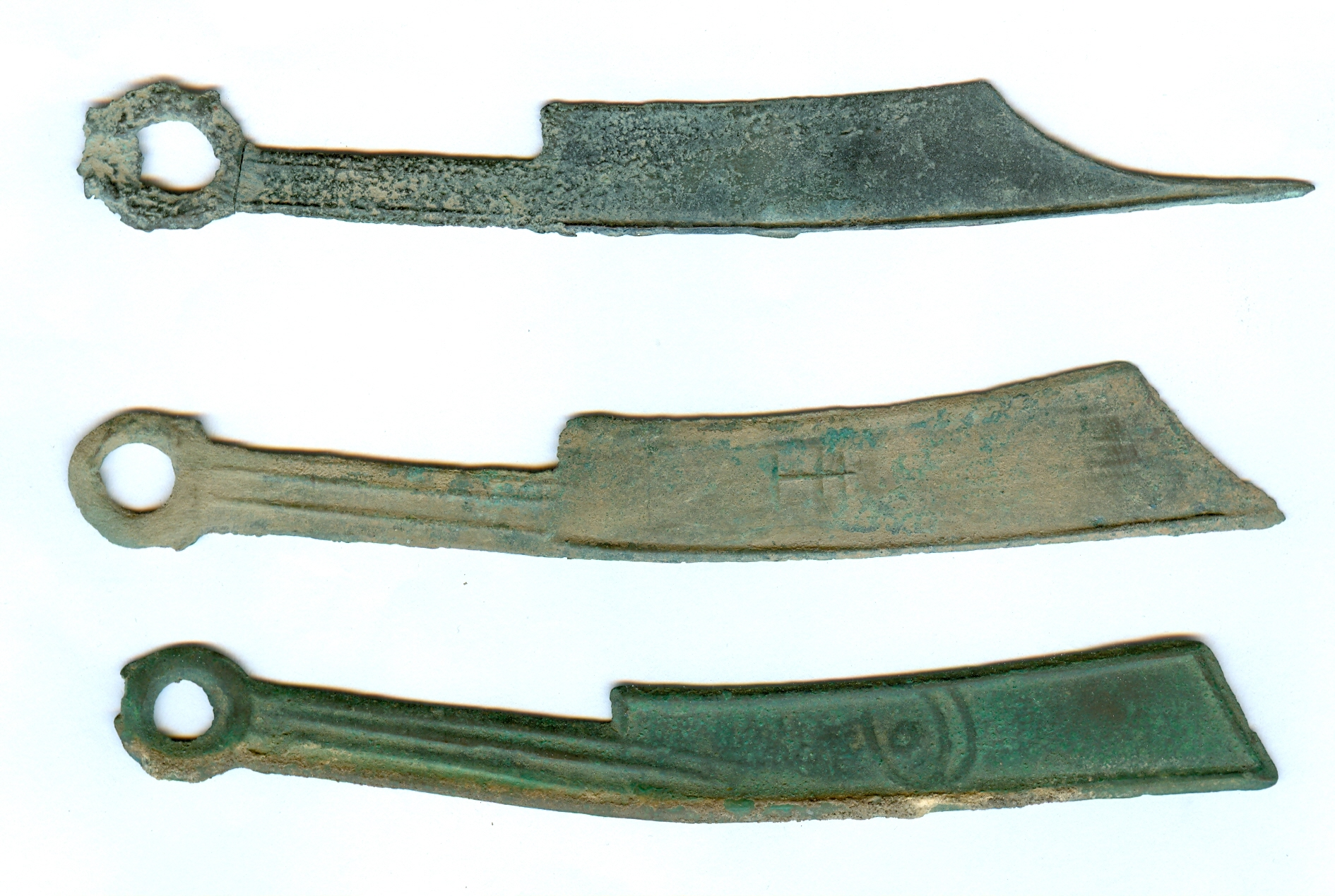
Yan State knife money (燕国刀币)

During the early Warring States, the state of Qi was one of the strongest in all of China. To show the strength of their kingdom and inherit the tradition of the fondness of knives as the northern grassland nationality, Qi carried out knife-money-system policy.

In 279 BC, in the charge of Tian Dan (Chinese: 田单; pinyin: tián dān), the senior general, Qi successfully wiped out the enemy unit, the alliance of Han, Zhao, Wei, Qin, Chu and retook the lost land. Moreover, Qi Xiangwang (Chinese: 齐襄王; pinyin: qí xiāng wáng), the leader of Qi, returned to his own land after the five-year exile from his kingdom. In order to celebrate the great victory and the return of Qi Xiangwang, Qi produced the six-word knife money (六字大刀). Besides the six-word one, there is three-word, four-word and five-word knife money as well.

== Early round coins ==
From 350 BC onwards, round coins started to be used. The round coins from the areas that previously used spade money, had round holes in their center. The round coins from the knife money areas typically had square holes. There are only two coins known to be exceptions to this general rule.

== Other coinages ==
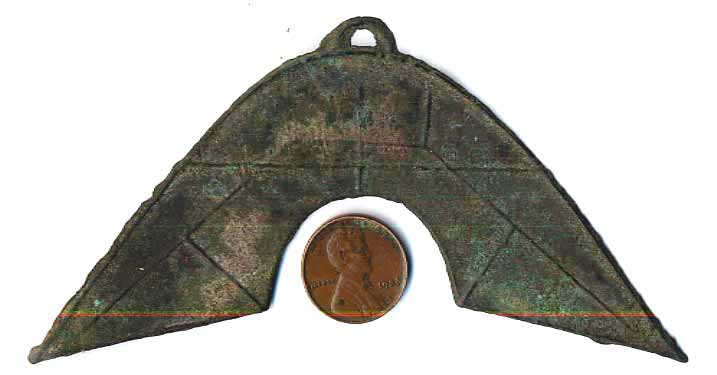
An example of Zhou dynasty era "bridge money".

There were other coinages where no contemporary historical sources mentions them. For this reason the validity of these objects as a form of currency is called into question. Because it is unknown if they were or weren't forms of ancient Chinese money, they are usually referred to as "pseudo money" or "odd shaped money" (simplified Chinese: 异形币; traditional Chinese: 異形幣; pinyin: yì xíng bì).

These currency are often named based on their shape, for example there is "fish money" (魚幣), "halberd money" (戟幣), and "bridge money" (橋幣). Some specimens of "bridge money" are further subdivided into more categories such as "tiger head bridge money" and "dragon head bridge money" based on their shape.

== See also ==
- History of Chinese currency
- Ancient Chinese coinage
- Chinese coinage in the Ming dynasty
- Jin dynasty coinage (1115–1234)
- Liao dynasty coinage
- Qing dynasty coinage
- Southern Song dynasty coinage
- Western Xia coinage
- Yuan dynasty coinage

Preceded by: Cowrie shells Reason: Adoption of metallic money systems.	Currency of China; 771 BC – 221 BC	Succeeded by: Ancient Chinese coinage (Ban Liang coins); Reason: Unification of China under the Qin.
