= Ming dynasty coinage =

Historical coinage of China

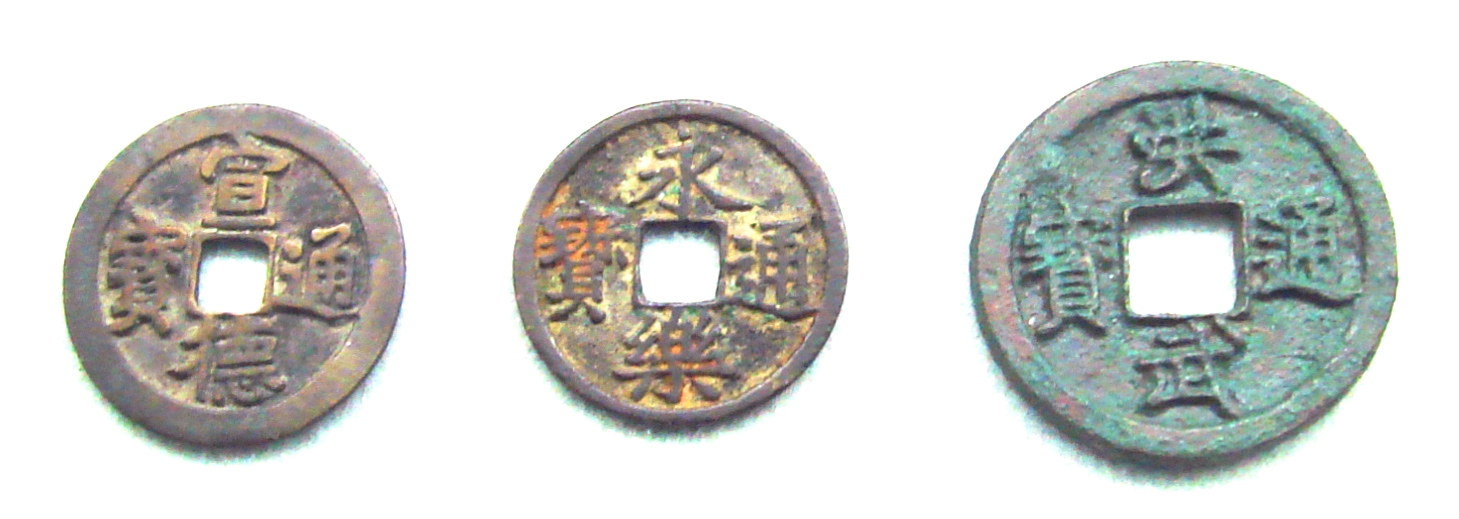
宣德通寶, 永樂通寶, and 洪武通寶 coins.

Chinese coinage in the Ming dynasty includes many types of coins. During the Ming dynasty of China (1368 to 1644), the national economy developed and techniques of producing coinage advanced.

The Ming dynasty cast comparatively few coins when compared with earlier dynasties in Chinese history, and the cash coins they did produce were not regarded to be as beautifully made as those of earlier times. The majority of cash coins in circulation at the time of the Ming were actually from the Tang (618 to 907) and Song dynasty (960 to 1279) eras. This all indicates that the emperors of the Ming dynasty did not regard coins with the same importance as those who ruled before them.

== Background ==
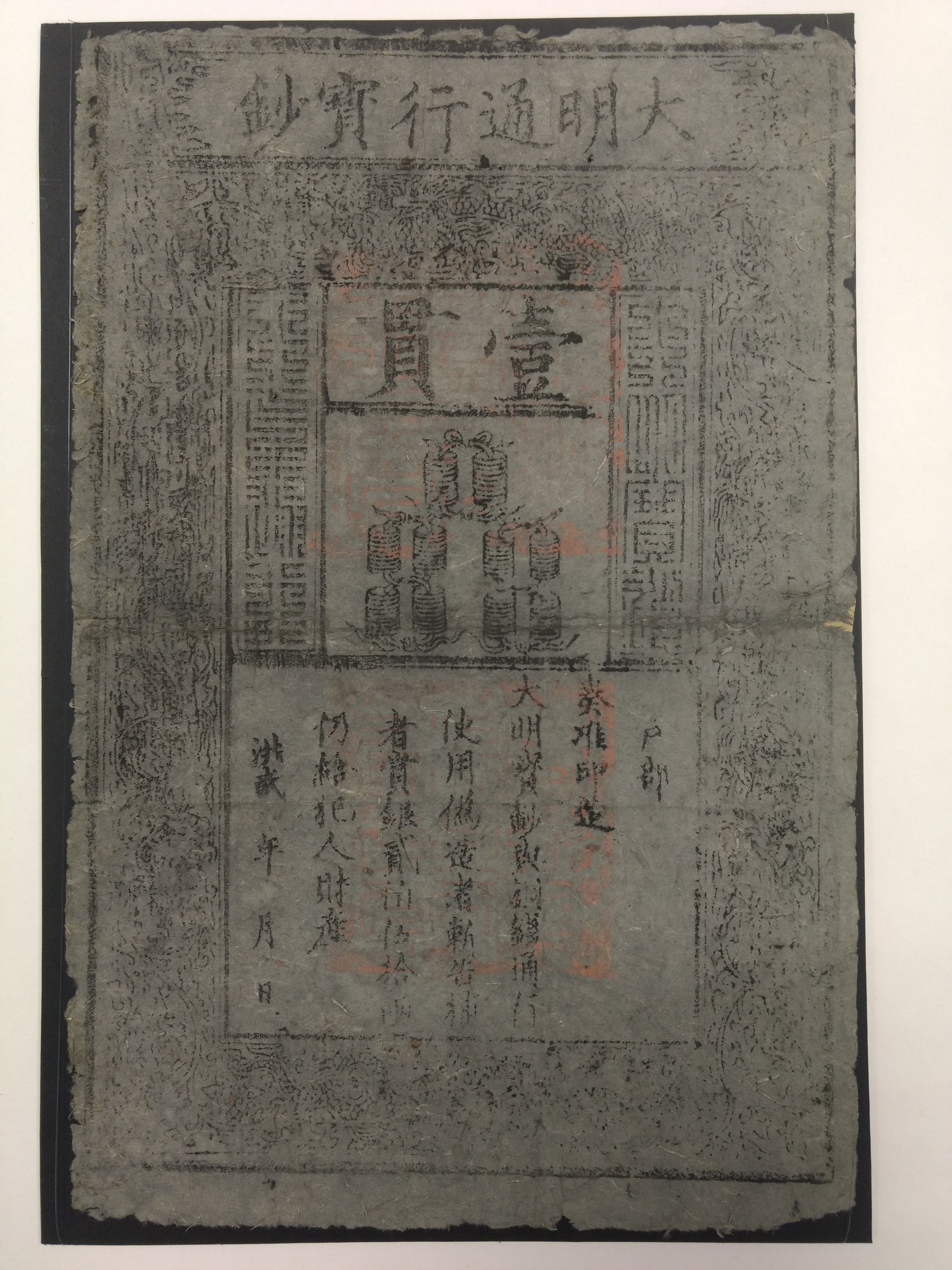
A Ming dynasty era paper banknote on display at the Museo de Prehistoria de Valencia in Valencia.

Zhu Yuanzhang, better known as the Hongwu Emperor, proclaimed the Great Ming in 1368. From the founding of the Ming until 1450, the emperors attempted to use paper currency, but this caused the Ming to experience the same hyperinflation as its predecessors. For the most part, the country was starved for silver in the early part of the dynasty and much trade occurred via barter; in later years, silver mostly came in through trade with either Manila in the Philippines as part of the Spanish East Indies within the Spanish colonial empire and Japan. The flow of Chinese trade goods like chinaware were exported towards the rest of the Spanish colonial empire in Spanish America and Europe through the Manila-Acapulco Galleon Trade between Manila in the Philippines to Acapulco in Mexico and Spanish treasure fleets from Veracruz in Mexico to Seville in Spain. Meanwhile, the return route also ensured constant supply of the Spanish silver dollar coins which were minted in New Spain (Mexico), and mined from Potosí in Bolivia or Peru. The Spanish dollar coins were often stamped with Chinese characters known as "chop marks" which indicated that the particular coin had been assayed by a well-known merchant and determined to be genuine. The widespread circulation of the Spanish silver dollar not only affected the Ming but also became widespread across many countries in the Far East as a standard for trade. It remained embedded even until the Qing dynasty when banknotes started to be printed labeled as "Mexican Dollars" and even later when Western powers also later issued trade dollars, and colonial currencies such as the Hong Kong dollar, to the same specifications. This silver flowed into the country and was also melted down and traded as bullion now known as sycee. However, the emperors also periodically minted coins. Alongside copper coins cowrie shells continued to circulate during this period as well.

== Coinage in the Ming era ==
After the Chinese became independent following the retreat of the Mongols back north and a bloody civil war culminating with the victory of Zhu Yuanzhang the Ming dynasty rose to power and under it a long period of stability and growth came. Until 1505 cash coins circulated alongside the Da Ming Baochao banknotes, but as more silver currency entered the Chinese market, currencies such as Spanish silver dollars started supplanting the cash coins. Privately minted cash coins of inferior quality became predominant in the south of China and 4 types of official cash coins were minted of varying quality of which one time with a weight of 1 qián was cast for payment to the imperial government, a second type of 0.9 qián for the salaries of officials, and the two types of lowest quality were mostly used by the commoners and circulated the most. Coins known as gold reverse coins were cast that were smelted four times as opposed to two and these were regarded as being more valuable, ironically because of this these gold reverse coins were being hoarded which prevented them from circulating causing even cheap and low quality counterfeit cash coins to circulate in larger numbers, after the government of the Ming dynasty started producing "milled rim" cash coins these were universally accepted so fast that at one point merchants accepted only these coins, but as the reputation of the gold reverse cash coins was so strong the "milled rim" coins were eventually viewed as worthless and deprecated.

The amount of copper-alloy cash coins produced by the Ming dynasty was higher than under the preceding Yuan dynasty (which had used paper notes, or zhibi (紙幣), extensively instead of metal coinages), but never reached the annual production outputs of the Song dynasty period.

The term "Zhiqian" (制錢) was used to discern full-valued cash coins produced by the imperial government from older ones from the Song dynasty period, which were known as jiuqian (舊錢), and privately produced forgeries of non-standard weights and alloys that were referred to as siqian (私錢) or sizhuqian (私鑄錢). Other terms used during the Ming dynasty for various types of cash coins include yangqian (样錢, "Model coin"), also known as Beiqian (北錢, "Northern coin"), which referred to full weight (1 qián) and fine quality cash coins had were delivered to Beijing as seigniorage revenue. Fengqian (俸錢, "Stipend coin") which referred to second rate cash coins that had a weight of 0.9 qián and were distributed through the salaries of government officials and emoluments. and Shangqian (賞錢, "Tip money") which is a term used to refer to cash coins that were small, thin, and very fragile (comparable to Sizhuqian) that were used to pay the wages of employees of the imperial government (including the mint workers themselves) and was one of the most commonly circulating types of cash coins during the Ming dynasty among the general population.

In the year 1393 there were a total of 325 furnaces in the mints all over the provinces which together had an annual production performance of 189,000 strings of cash coins (with a string being 1000 cash coins). This amount was only 3% of the annual mint production under the Northern Song dynasty. The raw material copper that was necessary for the production of Ming dynasty cash coinage came from mines in the provinces of Jiangxi, Shaanxi, and Shanxi. In the province of Jiangxi alone, a total of 115 furnaces were operating. In the other Chinese provinces, where copper ores were not naturally found to be mined, the government of the Ming dynasty had ordered the local people to deliver their copper objects to the provincial government mints for melting down to produce more cash coins.

Despite the government preferring paper money over copper-alloy cash coins, the Chinese market had a high demand for them, this demand would stimulate an overproduction of forgeries that inundated the markets of Ming China, often these forged cash coins were cast in such miserable quality that a single real Zhiqian could buy 300 fake ones. Consequently, this caused inflation in many different places. Under the reign of the Jiajing Emperor the government of the Ming dynasty would alleviate the situation by producing a large amount of Zhiqian with the inscription Jiajing Tongbao (嘉靖通寶) in the year Jiajing 5 (1527). In the year Jiajing 11 (1553) the government of the Ming dynasty cast 10,000,000 additional Jiajing Tongbao cash coins as well as Zhiqian with 9 earlier reign era names. In total, this amount of coinage amounted to 1,000,000 dìng (錠). (Note: 1 dìng (錠) is equal to 5,000 cash coins (文).)

Despite reigning only for one month, cash coins were produced that bear the reign title of the Taichang Emperor. These cash coins with the inscription Taichang Tongbao (泰昌通寶) were produced by his son, the Tianqi Emperor, in large quantities as a sign of filial piety.

In the early 17th century an increase in the price of copper caused the government to reduce the amount of copper in the composition of the Zhiqian in favour of lead. Cash coins with the inscriptions Tianqi Tongbao (天啟通寶) and Chongzhen Tongbao (崇禎通寶) were of poorer quality than those producing during preceding periods. These cash coins tended to be both thin and brittle, due to the lowered amount of copper in their compositions. Chinese people at this point started to refrain from using copper-alloy cash coins and the markets preferred the usage of silver ingots instead.

In the year 1621, Wang Xiangjian, the minister of war, had requested the government to cast Tianqi Tongbao cash coins n the denominations of 10 wén, 100 wén, and 1000 wén. The government granted him permission to cast 10 wén cash coins leading to debasement, in 1622 their production had ceased. Initially these cash coins weighed 1 tael but was reduced to 0.5 tael, because of their reduced weight they were only accepted for 6 to 8 standard cash coins.

In 1644 the Manchus captured Beijing from the Shun dynasty, and then marched south capturing the forces loyal to the Ming. One of the first monetary policies they enacted was accepting Ming dynasty cash coins at only half the value of Qing dynasty cash coins, because of this Ming era coinage was removed from circulation to be melted into Qing dynasty coinage, this is why in modern times even Song dynasty coins are more common than those from the more recent Ming dynasty.

A known variant of the Chongzhen Tongbao cash coins have only mint marks on the reverse side of the coin. An example of these Chongzhen Tongbao cash coins with mint marks the Chinese character "Zhong" (忠) which translates as either "loyal" or "honest" located above the reverse side of the square centre hole. During the Chongzhen Emperor's reign, there were a total of 156 different mint furnaces producing cash coins in operation. It remains currently unclear if the Chinese character "Zhong" (忠) refers to a particular mint or if it doesn't. Cash coins with this character typically have a diameter of 24.8 millimeters and a weight of 3 grams.

== List of Ming dynasty cash coins by inscription ==
Historically, Chinese coins were round with a square hole in the center. On the obverse side, there are usually words indicating the emperor's reign name or era name. On the reverse side, there are words or graphic patterns often indicating denomination or a mint mark. It is also possible that there is nothing on the reverse side. In the early period of the Ming dynasty, though, there were many different types of coin. Examples include:

- "Da Zhong Tong Bao" (traditional Chinese: 大中通寶; simplified Chinese: 大中通宝)
- "Hong Wu Tong Bao" (traditional Chinese: 洪武通寶; simplified Chinese: 洪武通宝)
- "Hong Xi Tong Bao" (traditional Chinese: 洪熙通寶; simplified Chinese: 洪熙通宝)
- "Yong Le Tong Bao" (traditional Chinese: 永樂通寶; simplified Chinese: 永乐通宝)
- "Zheng De Tong Bao" (traditional Chinese: 正德通寶; simplified Chinese: 正德通宝)
- "Hong Zhi Tong Bao" (traditional Chinese: 弘治通寶; simplified Chinese: 弘治通宝)
- "Jia Jing Tong Bao" (traditional Chinese: 嘉靖通寶; simplified Chinese: 嘉靖通宝)
- "Jia Jing An Bao" (traditional Chinese: 嘉靖安寶; simplified Chinese: 嘉靖安宝)
- "Wan Li Nian Zao" (traditional Chinese: 萬曆年造; simplified Chinese: 万历年造)
- "Wan Li Tong Bao" (traditional Chinese: 萬曆通寶; simplified Chinese: 万历通宝)
- "Tian Qi Tong Bao" (traditional Chinese: 天啟通寶; simplified Chinese: 天启通宝)
- "Chong Zhen Tong Bao" (traditional Chinese: 崇禎通寶; simplified Chinese: 崇祯通宝)

Most of the coinage names are derived from the titles of the reigns during which they were produced. For example,"Hong Wu Tong Bao" was produced during the Hongwu years (1368–1398). No coins with the inscription Zheng De Tong Bao (正德通寶) were ever produced for circulation by the Zhengde Emperor, however during the late Ming, and early Qing era many "lucky charms" with this inscription were produced. These charms usually contained more decorative reverses featuring various auspicious depictions. Some Chongzhen Tongbao cash coins were produced with the denomination 2 wén, and Chongzhen Tongbao cash coins produced by the Ministry of Public Works mint had the mint mark "工" (Gong) inscribed to its reverse.

=== Guizhou local issues ===
During the Hongzhi period from 1488 until 1505 some Tribal Commissioners in the province of Guizhou issued their own cash coins, rather than being bases on reign titles the inscriptions were based on place names.

Inscription	Traditional Chinese	Simplified Chinese	Emperor	Image
Shuiguan Tongbao	水官通寶	水官通宝	Hongzhi Emperor	
Taiguan Tongbao	太官通寶	太官通宝	Hongzhi Emperor	
Huoguan Tongbao	火官通寶	火官通宝	Hongzhi Emperor	
Dading Tongbao	大定通寶	大定通宝	Hongzhi Emperor	
Taiding Tongbao	太定通寶	太定通宝	Hongzhi Emperor	
Taizi Tongbao	太子通寶	太子通宝	Hongzhi Emperor	

=== Unused reign titles ===
No cash coins are known to have been cast and put into general circulation with the following seven Ming dynasty period reign titles: Jianwen (建文), Hongxi (洪熙), Zhengtong (正统), Jingtai (景泰), Tianshun (天顺), Chenghua (成化), and Zhengde (正德).

== Words on the coinage during the transitional period ==
During the transitional period between Ming and Qing, various rebels and pretenders made their own money with different Chinese characters on it. Usually, there are four words on each side of a coin.

Chinese characters on the Coinage in Pinyin	Traditional Chinese	Simplified Chinese	Producer
Yong Chang Tong Bao	Chinese: 永昌通寶	Chinese: 永昌通宝	Li Zicheng
Da Shun Tong Bao	Chinese: 大順通寶	Chinese: 大顺通宝	Zhang Xianzhong
Xi Wang Shang Gong	Chinese: 西王賞功	Chinese: 西王赏功	Zhang Xianzhong
Xing Chao Tong Bao	Chinese: 興朝通寶	Chinese: 兴朝通宝	Sun Kewang
Da Ming Tong Bao	Chinese: 大明通寶	Chinese: 大明通宝	Southern Ming
Hong Guang Tong Bao	Chinese: 弘光通寶	Chinese: 弘光通宝	Southern Ming
Long Wu Tong Bao	Chinese: 隆武通寶	Chinese: 隆武通宝	Southern Ming
Yong Li Tong Bao	Chinese: 永曆通寶	Chinese: 永历通宝	Southern Ming
Zhao Wu Tong Bao	Chinese: 昭武通寶	Chinese: 昭武通宝	Wu Sangui
Li Yong Tong Bao	Chinese: 利用通寶	Chinese: 利用通宝	Wu Sangui
Hong Hua Tong Bao	Chinese: 洪化通寶	Chinese: 洪化通宝	Wu Shifan
Yu Min Tong Bao	Chinese: 裕民通寶	Chinese: 裕民通宝	Geng Jingzhong

== Hong Xi Tong Bao ==
"Hong Xi Tong Bao" (洪|熙通寶) was produced in 1425, during Hongxi years, when Zhu Gaochi was the emperor of Ming. These coins are very rare. Until now, only two of them have ever turned up in public. Still, one has been lost and the other now is in the Chinese History Museum. "Hong Xi Tong Bao" has been regarded as a piece of national historical relics in China.

== Yong Le Tong Bao ==
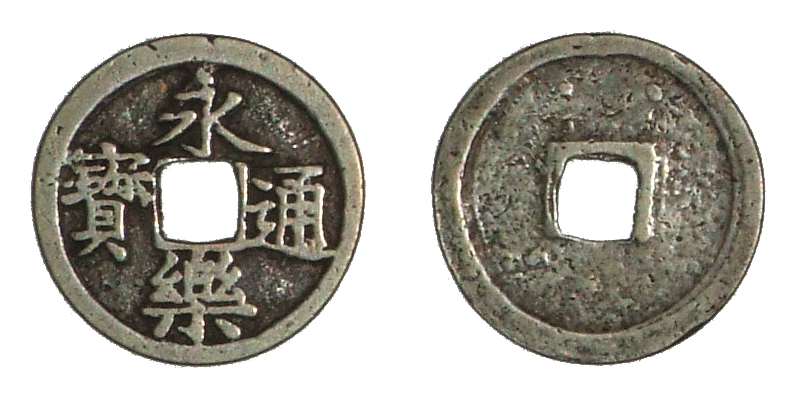
A Yǒng-Lè Tōng-Bǎo (永樂通寶) coin.

"Yǒng-Lè Tōng-Bǎo" (永|樂通寶) was produced by Zhu Di, one of the emperors of the Ming. In the earliest days of the dynasty, paper money was widely used. After Zhu Di came to the throne, he carried out a series of reforms covering all fields, including politics, economy, culture, military and diplomacy. Stemming from diplomatic and foreign trade needs, he produced the "Yǒng-Lè Bǎo-Tōng" in 1408.

Originally, the "Yǒng-Lè Bǎo-Tōng" was not intended to circulate within China itself as cash coins had gradually been replaced by silver sycees and paper money. The coin was instead intended for trade with countries like Japan and the Ryukyu Kingdom.

== Chong Zhen Tong Bao ==
"Chong Zhen Tong Bao" (崇|禎通寶) was the coin produced by the last Ming Emperor, the Chongzhen Emperor. It was issued in various denominations. On the reverse side, there are numerous characters and dots, whose meaning are still not clear. At the time, there were mints run by the Board of Revenue in Nanjing and Beijing.

== Xing Chao Tong Bao ==
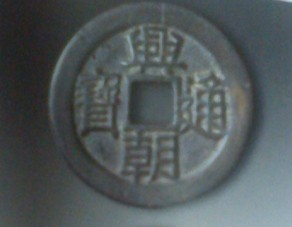
A "Xing Chao Tong Bao" (興朝通寶) coin.

"Xing Chao Tong Bao" (興|朝通寶) was produced by Sun Kewang, in 1649 (sixth year of Shunzhi), when he became the Dongping King. At that time, Sun produced a large number of "Xing Chao Tong Bao" and it had its distinct features with a profound influence. The style of the Chinese characters on the coinage was plain. Most of the coinage was made of copper. Though the work was a little rough, it was given full weight. This style was reflected in the later "Li Yong Bao Tong", "Zhao Wu Tong Bao" (昭|武通寶) produced by Wu San-Gui and "Hong Hua Tong Bao" produced by Wu Shifan.

== Xi Wang Shang Gong and Zhang Xianzhong ==
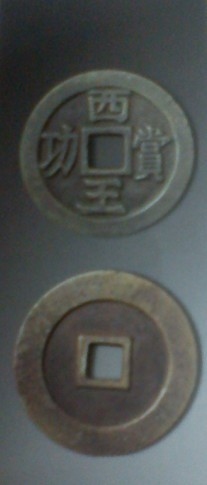
A Xi Wang Shao Gong coin on display at a museum.

Zhang Xianzhong was the famous leader of a peasant rebel army in the late Ming dynasty. In 1630, he joined the peasant rebel army. In 1643, he was entitled "Da Xing Wang". In 1644, he dominated Sichuan and became the king of Chengdu, named the reigning dynasty as "Da Xi" and his reign as "Da Shun". Zhang produced his own money called the "Da Shun Tong Bao" (大|順通寶) as the official currency. In order to honor those who made contributions to Da Xi dynasty, he produced another money called "Xi Wang Shang Gong" (西|王賞功) as an award to them. There are four kinds of "Xi Wang Shang Gong", which are made of gold, gilding, silver and copper. At that time, the peasant rebel army won the people's great admiration and support. The "Da Shun Tong Bao" was often sewn onto clothing as a sort of celebration to honor the peasant rebel army. Since it was very difficult to acquire the "Xi Wang Shang Gong", it was very rare and precious. It was nearly impossible to get, enough so that ordinary people could not often get it. As a result, there are very few remaining today.

== See also ==
- History of Chinese currency
- Ancient Chinese coinage
- Zhou dynasty coinage
- Liao dynasty coinage
- Southern Song dynasty coinage
- Western Xia coinage
- Jin dynasty coinage (1115–1234)
- Yuan dynasty coinage
- Qing dynasty coinage
- Economy of the Ming dynasty

== Sources ==
- Ebrey, Patricia Buckley (1999). The Cambridge Illustrated History of China. Cambridge: Cambridge University Press. ISBN 978-0-521-66991-7.
- Hartill, David (2005). Cast Chinese Coins: A Historical Catalogue. Trafford. ISBN 978-1-4120-5466-9.
- She, Ben. Liaoning Provincial Museum - take you into the museum. ISBN 9787501019915
- Zhong Guo Qian Bi Da Ci Dian Bian Zuan Wei Yuan H
- Chinese Coin Dictionary: Yuan and Ming Dynasties (Mandarin Chinese Edition) ISBN 7101082424

Preceded by: Yuan dynasty coinage Reason: Red Turban Rebellion.	Currency of China; 1368 – 1644	Succeeded by: Qing dynasty coinage Reason: Manchu conquest of China. Ratio: 1 Qing wén for 2 Ming wén.
