= Liao dynasty coinage =

Historical coinage of China

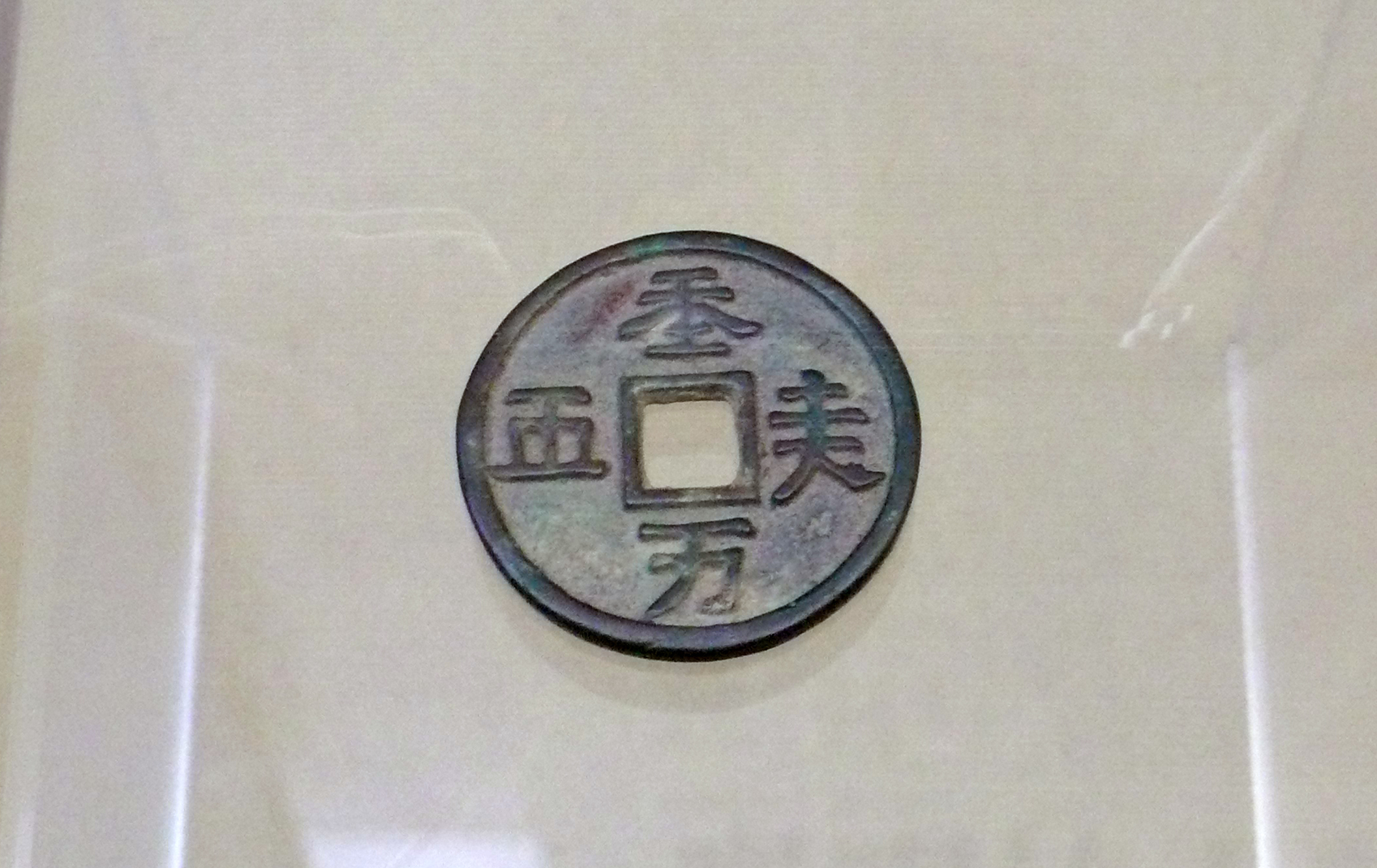
A Liao dynasty coin with its inscription written in Khitan large script on display at the National Museum of Chinese Writing.

The Liao dynasty was a Khitan-led dynasty of China that ruled over parts of Northern China, Manchuria, the Mongolian Plateau, northern Korean Peninsula, and what is modern-day Russian Far East from 916 until 1125 when it was conquered by the Jin dynasty. Remnants of the Liao court fled westward and created the Western Liao dynasty which in turn was annexed by the Mongol Empire in 1218.

Liao dynasty coins were based on the cash coins of the Song dynasty but generally tend to be of inferior quality, early Liao dynasty coins were only rarely produced and not before the reign of Emperor Xingzong (1031–1055).

Liao dynasty coins (like some contemporary Song dynasty coins) can be read top-right-bottom-left (clockwise), but unlike the Song's coinage never appeared top-bottom-right-left. Liao dynasty era coins have appeared in both Chinese and Khitan scripts. The coins in Khitan script do tend to have different character orders, Though these coins weren't meant for circulation.

Liao dynasty cash coins were cast with a reddish copper-alloy. They were typically crude, unevenly cast, and with poor calligraphy.

Liao coinage is extremely rare compared to Song dynasty coinage. While the Song dynasty produced millions of strings of wén annually, the Khitans never exceeded 500.

== History ==
=== Early Khitan coinage ===
The majority of the coinage that were recovered are mentioned in records from the year 1021, prior to that year it's unclear which currency was produced despite later Khitan records mentioning that the Emperor Taizong of Liao promoted metallurgy and coin mintage. Numismatic and archeological research have proven inconclusive to date if any coinage was produced during the early days of the Liao dynasty.

Common hypotheses suggest that crude coinage was produced in the agricultural southern regions of the Liao dynasty (which were only annexed in 938), this however has been deemed improbable by Liao dynasty historians Karl August Wittfogel, and Fêng Chia-Shêng. The southern 16 prefectures continued the production of as well as exchanging older Chinese coins, while in the northern regions of the Liao dynasty barter and the usage of coth money still prevailed until the reign of Emperor Shengzong.

=== Move towards a money-based economy ===
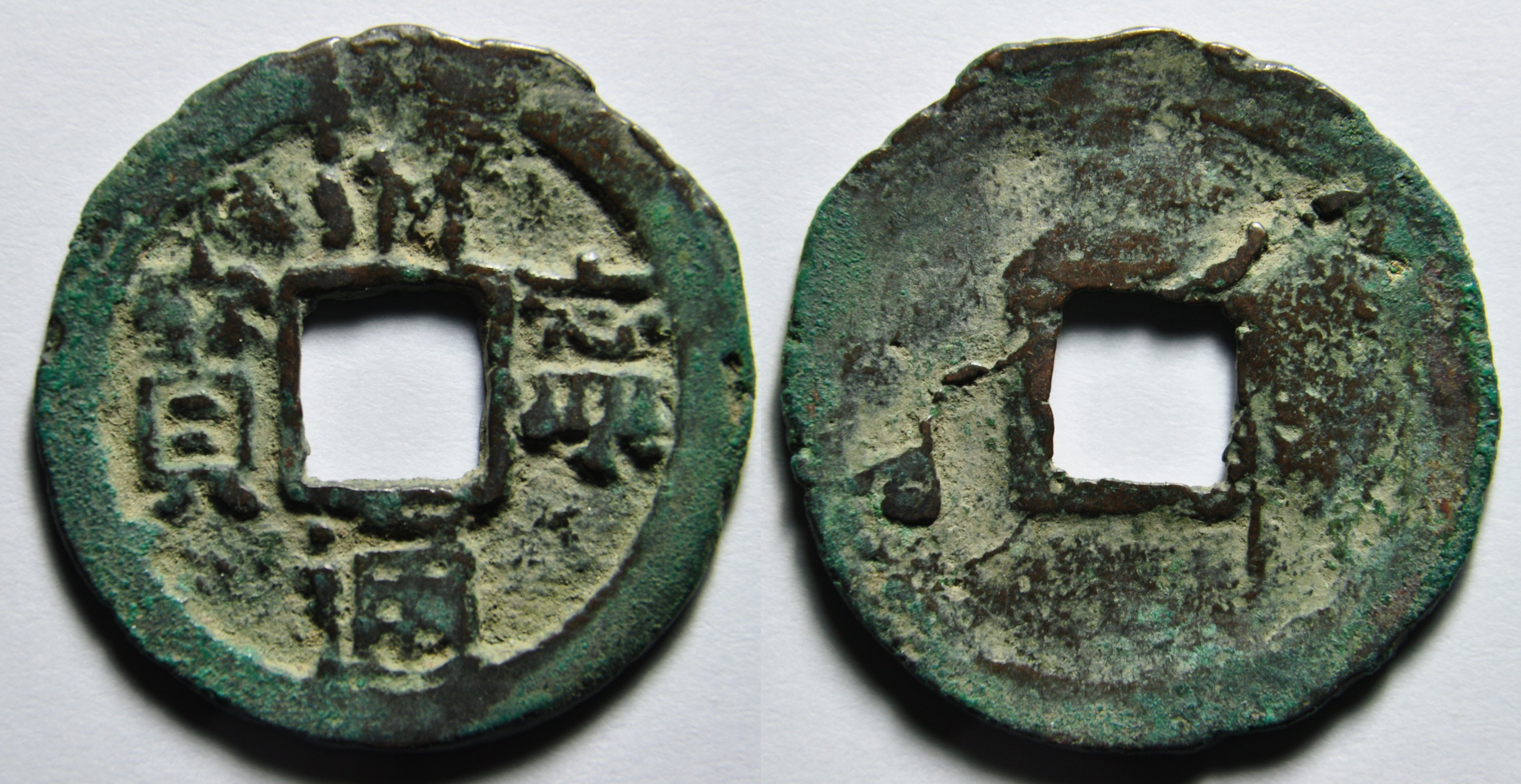
A Qing Ning Tong Bao (Chinese: 清寧通寳) coin, a Liao dynasty coin with Chinese inscription.

By the end of the 10th century more copper mines had opened and an abundance of old coins were found which lead to the increase of coins in circulation, under Daozong the production of coinage had risen to 500 strings a year (or 500,000 cash coins). Many Song dynasty copper coins started entering the Liao dynasty, often as payments for salt and other Liao export products. Copper coin from the Song dynasty were exchanged with the Liao's iron coins at the border region set up as a protective measure to prevent the more valuable copper Liao coinage from leaving the country.

By the beginning of the 12th century more Song coins circulated in the Liao dynasty than native coinage, this also applied to the northern regions where previously Chinese coinage had remained scarce, this was evident by the fact that the Dongjing circuit was able to collect 400,000,000 cash coins as part of its 10% tax programme (despite it suffering from lowered export due to the Liao's anti-Balhae policies), proving that the influx of Song dynasty currency was more responsible for creating a money-based economy than the Liao government's own efforts. Similarly the Zhongjing circuit once collected 200,000,000 within 6 months, while Xijing's income remained insignificant. Nanjing (present day Beijing) was the wealthiest region having an annual income of 5,492,906,000 cash coins as reported in 1123 on a tax of 10%.

Though it's more likely that these tax incomes were considerably smaller as these numbers were inflated due to the government collecting more tax for its military expenditures as its peace-time income was significantly lower. Another likelihood that these numbers are inflated is that barter still prevailed n the tribal region of the Liao (all circuits except for Nanjing), and during an economic crisis in Nanjing in 1118 payments were made in silk rather than in copper coins.

=== Monetary policy of the Liao dynasty ===
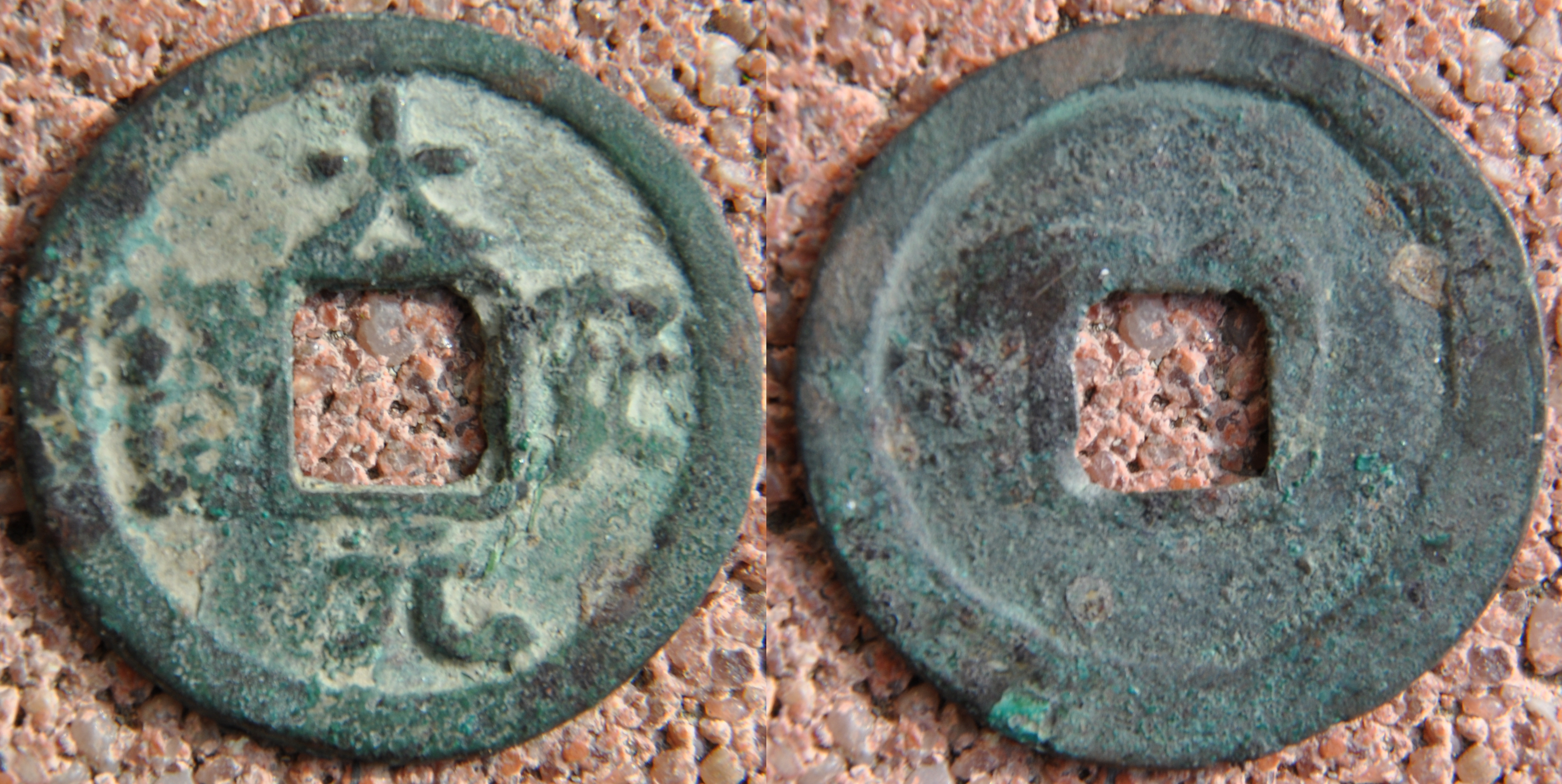
A Da An Yuan Bao (大安元寶) coin, Yuan Bao coins tend to be heavier than Tong Bao (通寶) coins.

For 2 centuries Liao dynasty coins weighed the same until the issue of the first Yuan Bao (元寶) coin series, the next 2 generations of coins were lighter which invited private production which the Liao government had outlawed. Lighter coinage became preferred during the Da An period as a measure against the outflow of currency to other countries, though under Tianzuo (the last emperor) the Liao started producing heavier coinage again but this didn't stop the inflation which was caused by the lack of commodities rather than a lack of quality in the coinage. Unlike the Chinese had during the Han and Tang dynasties, the Khitans never resorted to decrease the quality of their coins, as they didn't have any incitement for debasement. This was mostly because the majority of the wealth in the country belonged to the Imperial family, the Khitan nobility, and the Chinese Mandarins who would’ve suffered the most from inflation as there was no influential business class like those that threatened Chinese authorities.

== List of coins produced by the Liao dynasty ==
The coins produced by the Khitans were:

Inscription	Traditional Chinese	Simplified Chinese	Years of minting	Emperor	Image
Tian Zan Tong Bao	天贊通寶	天赞通宝	?–927	Taizong	
Tian Xian Tong Bao	天顯通寶	天显通宝	927–937	Taizong	
Hui Tong Tong Bao	會同通寶	会同通宝	938–947	Taizong	
Tian Lu Tong Bao	天祿通寶	天禄通宝	947–951	Shizong	
Ying Li Tong Bao	應曆通寶	应历通宝	951–969	Muzong	
Bao Ning Tong Bao	保寧通寶	保宁通宝	969–982	Jingzong	
Tong He Yuan Bao	統和元寶	統和元宝	983–1011	Shengzong	
Chong Xi Tong Bao	重熙通寶	重熙通宝	1032–1055	Xingzong	
Qing Ning Tong Bao	清寧通寶	清宁通宝	1055–1064	Daozong	
Xian Yong Tong Bao	咸雍通寶	咸雍通宝	1065–1074	Daozong	
Da Kang Tong Bao	大康通寶	大康通宝	1074–1084	Daozong	
Da Kang Yuan Bao	大康元寶	大康元宝	1074–1084	Daozong	
Da An Yuan Bao	大安元寶	大安元宝	1085–1094	Daozong	
Shou Chang Yuan Bao	壽昌元寶	寿昌元宝	1095–1101	Daozong	
Qian Tong Yuan Bao	乾統元寶	乾统元宝	1101–1110	Tianzuo	
Tian Qing Yuan Bao	天慶元寶	天庆元宝	1111–1120	Tianzuo	

=== Commemorative coins ===
Inscription	Traditional Chinese	Simplified Chinese	Emperor	Image
Qian Qiu Wan Sui	千秋萬歲	千秋万岁	Taizong	
Da Liao Tian Qing	大遼天慶	大辽天庆	Daozong	

== Mintage figures ==
The Liao dynasty did not produce many cash coins, they only had an annual output of about 500.000 cash coins, it is therefore likely that Song dynasty cash coins were still mostly being used during the Liao dynasty. Because the Khitan people minted very few coins, and not every emperor minted coins with era names, forged Khitan coins have appeared since the Qing Dynasty. At the beginning of the 21st century, a large number of forged ancient Liao coins appeared in mainland China, many of which were does not exist in history.

== Western Liao dynasty ==
Scholars from the Qing dynasty long attributed the cash coins Gantian Yuanbao (感天元寳) and Kangguo Tongbao (康國通寳) to have been issued by the Qara Khitai Khanate, this was repeated by scholars from both the Western world and China without question until later research discovered that this was a myth. However, the so-called “Gantian Yuanbao” might be just a misinterpretation of the Tiangan Yuanbao (天感元寳) of the Ly Dynasty in Vietnam. During this period, the Khitans only minted coins with era names. The Qara Khitai Khanate is suspected to have produced round coins with Persian language inscriptions in Al-Ūzjand (modern day Uzgen, Kyrgyzstan), however the attribution of these coins remain ambiguous and is debated among numismatists. Despite for the fact that for a long time no cash coins could attributed to the Qara Khitai Khanate many modern counterfeiters in Mainland China produced fantasy "Western Liao dynasty cash coins" using the reign titles of Western Liao Khans.

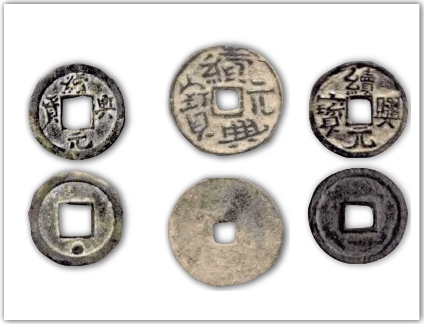
Xuxing Yuanbao（續興元寶） founded in Kyrgyzstan

Imitations of Kaiyuan Tongbao (開元通寳), Qianyuan Zhongbao (乾元重寳), and Zhouyuan Tongbao (周元通寶) cash coins from the Tang and Later Zhou dynasties, respectively, have been attributed to the Qara Khitai Khanate however the production of these was scarce. In November 2008 some rather unusual Chinese cash coins were unearthed at the Aq-Beshim site in Kyrgyzstan which lies near what used to be site of the ancient city of Suyab. Initially these cash coins were assumed to have the inscription "Jixing Yuanbao" (績興元寳), as the manufacturing method of these coins was rather crude and their calligraphy poor as well as the reign title Jixing being unknown in Chinese historiography scholars deduced that these cash-in coins had to be produced locally. Initially it was assumed that these coins were in fact coin-like charms but in October 2010 another coin with this inscription was found at the Qara-Jigach site (ancient Tarsakent), the inscription of this coin was more readable which corrected the earlier assumptions and this series was confirmed to bear the inscription "Xuxing Yuanbao" (續興元寳), in February 2011 another Xuxing Yuanbao cash coin was unearthed in Kyrgyzstan at the site of what used to be the ancient city of Navekat (Nawikath) in modern-day Krasnaya Rechka which confirmed that they were in fact monetary objects.

In February 2022, a coin with the inscription "Tiānxǐ yuánbǎo" (天喜元寶) was found at the Burana site in Kyrgyzstan, in the vicinity of the Qara Khitai capital of Balasagun. This has been identified as a Western Liao coin dating to the Tianxi era (1178–1218) of the last Western Liao emperor.

== Liao dynasty coin charms ==
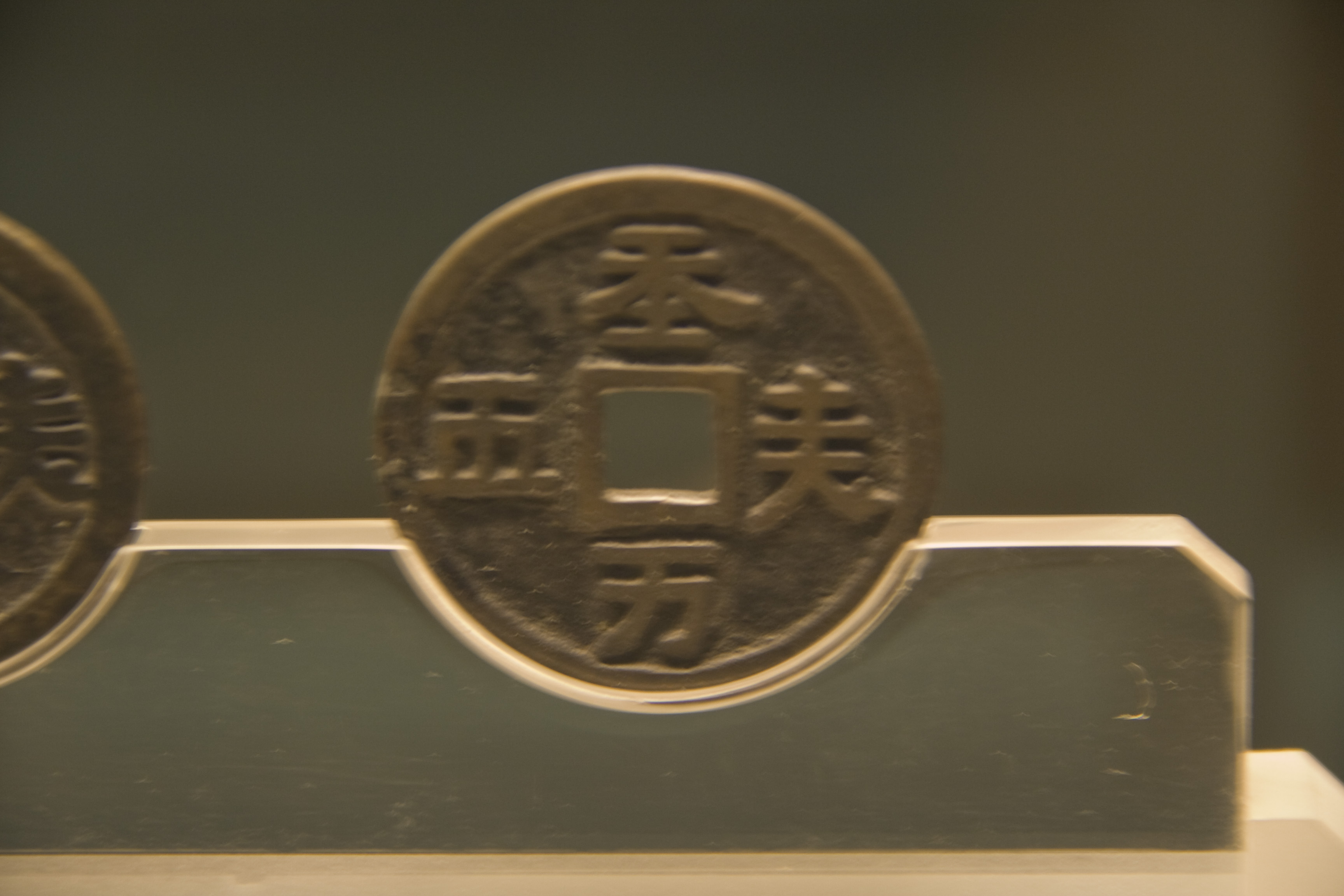
A Liao dynasty golden coin with its inscription written in Khitan large script on display at Shanghai Museum.

Liao dynasty charms are Chinese numismatic charms produced during the Khitan Liao dynasty that are written in Khitan script and, unlike Liao dynasty coins, were read counterclockwise. Because Khitan script hasn't been completely deciphered, these rare charms aren't fully understood by modern experts. Some Liao dynasty era charms had no inscriptions at all, and are not well understood as the Khitan people may have interpreted certain symbols differently from the Chinese. One of the most well-known Liao dynasty charms is the "Mother of Nine Sons" charm, which bears no inscription. It depicts three groups of three people which are believed to be the sons of the woman riding a dragon on the other side; the three groups are believed to symbolise the three levels of the imperial examination system. A more recent hypothesis proposes that the person riding the dragon is the Yellow Emperor returning to the heavens and that the people represent the Nine Provinces (九州).

== Hoards of Liao dynasty cash coins ==
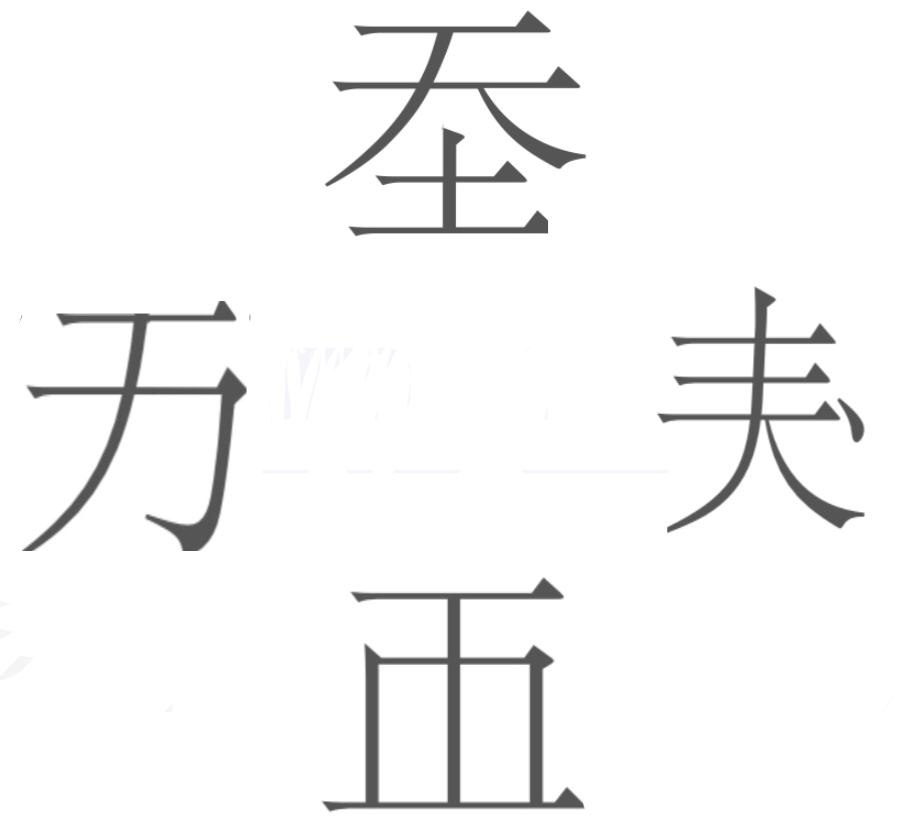
- On 15 May 1977 a cash coin with Khitan large script was found 1 kilometer west of the “Liao Shangjing site”, located in Lindong, Baarin Left Banner, Inner Mongolia by Shi Yuilan. The inscription of the coin, , has been interpret as meaning Tianchao Wanshun (天朝萬順, "Heavenly Dynasty — Myriad [affairs are] Favourable"). Furthermore, in the year 1977 another Tianchao Wanshun cash coin was unearthed at the site, this was a silver version with eight Khitan characters scratched onto its reverse side.
- During the 1990s a small gold Tianchao Wanshun (天朝萬順) cash coin was discovered at Hexigten Banner, Inner Mongolia. The inscription of the cash coin is read counterclockwise. In the year 2017 it had an estimated market value of between ¥460,000 and ¥600,000.

== See also ==
- History of the Khitans
- History of Chinese currency
- Zhou dynasty coinage
- Ancient Chinese coinage
- Southern Song dynasty coinage
- Western Xia coinage
- Jin dynasty coinage (1115–1234)
- Yuan dynasty coinage
- Ming dynasty coinage
- Qing dynasty coinage

== Sources ==
- Hartill, David (September 22, 2005). Cast Chinese Coins. Trafford, United Kingdom: Trafford Publishing. ISBN 978-1412054669.

Preceded by: Ancient Chinese coinage Reason: Khitan conquest of the Later Jin dynasty.	Currency of Northern China; 907 – 1125	Succeeded by: Jin dynasty coinage Reason: Jurchen conquest of the Liao dynasty.
