= Yuan dynasty coinage =

Historical coinage of China

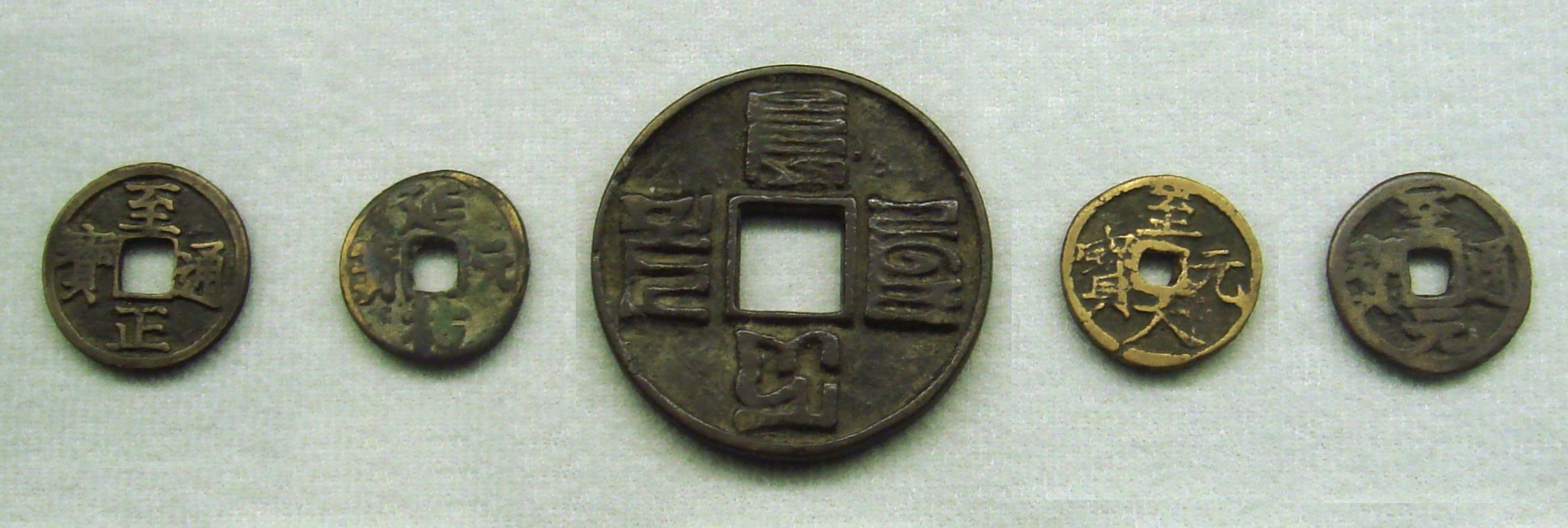
Coins of the Yuan dynasty.

The Yuan dynasty was a Mongol-ruled Chinese dynasty which existed from 1271 to 1368. After the conquest of the Western Xia, Western Liao, and Jin dynasties they allowed for the continuation of locally minted copper currency, as well as allowing for the continued use of previously created and older forms of currency (from previous Chinese dynasties), while they immediately abolished the Jin dynasty's paper money as it suffered heavily from inflation due to the wars with the Mongols. After the conquest of the Song dynasty was completed, the Yuan dynasty started issuing their own copper coins largely based on older Jin dynasty models, though eventually the preferred Yuan currency became the Jiaochao and silver sycees, as coins would eventually fall largely into disuse. Although the Mongols at first preferred to have every banknote backed up by gold and silver, high government expenditures forced the Yuan to create fiat money in order to sustain government spending.

Inscriptions on the obverses of the coins appeared both in Traditional Chinese characters and 'Phags-pa script, and coins appeared in denominations of 2, 3, 5, and even 10 wén, the larger denominations led to a debasement of the currency which caused inflation.

== Background ==
After the Mongol Empire began their campaigns against the Western Liao, Western Xia, and Jin dynasties, they started to cast their own copper cash coins with the inscription "Da Chao Tong Bao" (Chinese: 大朝通寶). It is currently unknown if these coins were already cast under Genghis Khan or if production started under Kublai Khan during the Yuan dynasty as these coins are undocumented and rare. Production of Yuan dynasty copper coins with the "Zhong Tong Yuan Bao" (中統元寶) coins commissioned by Kublai Khan started concurrently with the issuance of paper money which was backed up by silver sycees.

Prior to the establishment of the Yuan dynasty, Möngke Khan created the Department of Monetary Affairs in 1253 to oversee the issuing and creation of paper money, this was to ensure that the nobility would not cause more inflation by overprinting money. The Yuan dynasty would see the introduction of the bimetallic standard, copper would be used for short distance, and silver for long distance transactions.

== History ==
=== Kublai Khan, Temür Khan, and Külüg Khan ===
Kublai Khan asked his advisor Liu Bingzhong about the usage of coinage and with a Yin and Yang metaphor Bingzhong claimed that no peace could exist within the Yuan empire if coins continued to be used and advised for the exclusive circulation of mulberry bark paper money.

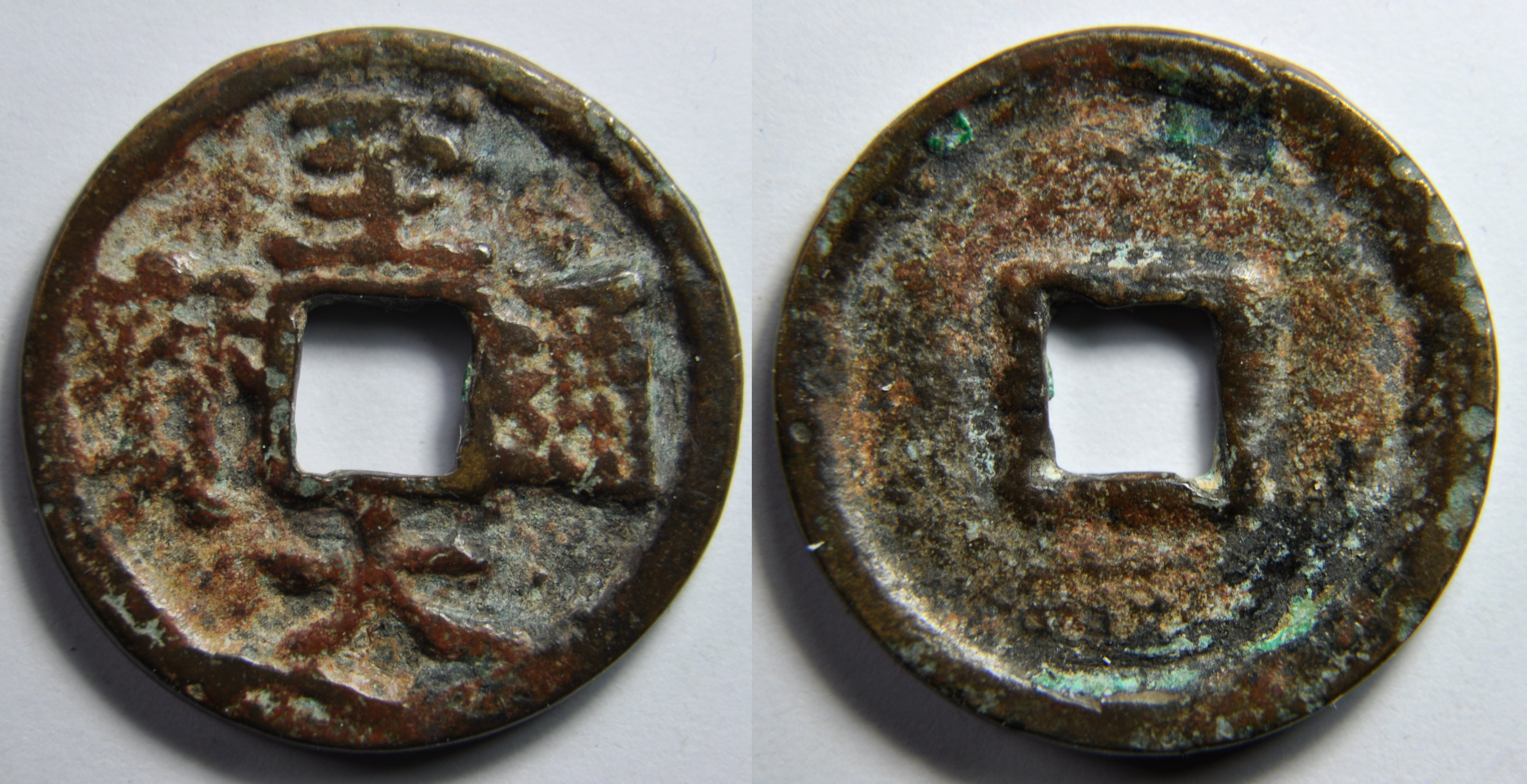
A "Zhida Tongbao" (至大通寶) coin issued under Külüg Khan.

The "Zhongtong Yuanbao" coins were only cast for 3 years (1260 to 1263), later coins would again be issued under Kublai Khan. In the year 1285 Liu Shirong advocated for the creation of the Zhiyuan Tongbao (至元通寶) cash coins, stating that the Mongols should follow the examples of the Han and Tang dynasties in the production of copper-alloy cash coins, and that these cash coins should circulate concurrent with silk and paper money.

For the entire duration of Temür Khan coins were only symbolically cast for religious institutions.

Under Külüg Khan the Yuan dynasty’s treasury was almost completely depleted which eventually led to Külüg Khan issuing a new banknote called the "Zhi Da Yin Jiaochao" (至大銀鈔) which coincided with the minting of "Zhida Tongbao" (至大通寶) coins, which are the most commonly cast Yuan era coins. Under Külüg Khan the levels of inflation rose to 80% as the government kept printing more banknotes due, and in order to ensure the government’s control on the currency Külüg Khan banned the usage of silver and gold coins, and stopped the circulation of silver certificates in favour of fiat banknotes.

=== Ayurbarwada Buyantu Khan and the cessation of production ===
Ayurbarwada Buyantu Khan completely ceased the production of coinage in favour of paper money and made it illegal to use coins for payment, however the private production of copper cash coins would persist despite these laws. Because the khans of the Yuan dynasty were Buddhists they allowed Buddhist temples exemption from taxation and granted them special rights to cast bronze statues, and mint their own coins for religious offerings. During the periods that paper money was considered to be less valuable due to inflation people would use these "temple coins" (供養錢) as substitute currency.

=== Toghon Temür ===
For 40 years the production of coins would not continue until the reign of Toghon Temür who started casting coins again in 1350 alongside his new series of banknotes.

There are three basic typed of the Zhizheng Tongbao (至正通寶) cash coins. The first type has the Earthly Branch, indicating the year of casting, written in 'Phags-pa script located above the square centre hole situated on the reverse side of the cash coin. The Zhizheng Tongbao cash coins with the reverse inscription "寅" (meaning 1350 in the Chinese calendar) are the rarest because they began to be cast in November 1350 meaning that their production period was relatively short. This type was cast in values of 1 wén, 2 wén, and 3 wén.

The 'Phags-pa words on these Zhizheng Tongbao cash coins represent the following years:

List of production marks
'Phags-pa	Traditional Chinese	Hanyu Pinyin	Year of production	Image
	寅	yín	1350	
	卯	mǎo	1351	
	辰	chén	1352	
	巳	sì	1353	
	午	wǔ	1354	

In some variants reverse side of the cash coin displays the Mongol word for the Chinese cyclical calendar characters "Geng Yin" (庚寅, gēng yín) which indicates that these cash coins were cast somewhere in the year 1350. These cash coin typically have a diameter of 33 millimeters and tend to have a weight of about 8.8 grams.

The second type of Zhizheng Tongbao cash coins have the Earthly Branch of their year of production above the square centre hole on the reverse side, and the nominal value of the coin below the square centre hole. For example, the words "戌十" (xū shí) would denote that the cash coin was produced in the year 1358 and a nominal value of 10 wén. The denominations of this type were cast as 2 wén, 3 wén, 5 wén, and 10 wén.

The third type of Zhizheng Tongbao cash coins have the Earthly Branch representing the year of production above the square centre hole on the reverse side, and the nominal weight of the coin below the square centre hole. For example, the 'Phags-pa transliteration of the word "亥" (hài) written above the square centre hole to denote that the cash coin was produced in the year 1359 and the words "壹兩重" (yī liǎng chóng) inscribed below the square centre hole which translates as "1 tael in weight".

In 1350 chancellor Toqto'a attempted to reform the Yuan dynasty currency by printing out more paper money and creating large "Zhizheng Zhibao" (至正之寶) copper coins which were inscribed with the promise that these coins were backed in paper money (權鈔, quán chāo, which translates as "equivalent to paper money"), and that these would be in equal value. The calligraphy of the inscription for the Zhizheng Zhibao cash coins was done by the court poet Zhou Boqi.

The reverse side of the Zhizheng Zhibao cash coins have to the left of the square centre hole the traditional Chinese characters indicating the nominal value of the coin, for example, the equivalent of wǔ qián (伍錢, "5 qián") in paper money.

List of Zhizheng Zhibao (至正之寶) denominations
Denomination (in paper money)	Traditional Chinese	Hanyu Pinyin	Image
5 fen	伍分權鈔	wǔ fēn quán chāo	
1 mace	壹錢權鈔	yī qián quán chāo	
1 mace, 5 fen	壹錢伍分權鈔	yī qián wǔ fēn quán chāo	
2 mace, 5 fen	貳錢伍分權鈔	èr qián wǔ fēn quán chāo	
5 mace	伍錢權鈔	wǔ qián quán chāo	

As the paper money was made out of inferior material it would often be easily damaged making it hard for the people to redeem, this led to rebellions in the southern regions which in turn caused the Yuan government to quickly print more money in order to finance its military expenditures, leading to a decreasing confidence in paper money causing hyperinflation. Eventually entire carts filled with banknotes were needed for simple transactions leading to the people disregarding paper money as currency and eventually barter had become the norm as coinage had already become a rarity.

After the rise of the Ming dynasty the Northern Yuan dynasty didn't continue to produce cash coins. The usage of paper currency under the Yuan further inspired other countries such as Korea, Japan, and various states of India to develop their own paper currencies.

== List of coins issued ==
Coins issued by the Mongols before the establishment of the Yuan dynasty include the "Da Chao Tong Bao" (大朝通寶), "Da Guan Tong Bao" (大觀通寶), "Tai He Tong Bao" (泰和重寶), and "Da Ding Tong Bao" (大定通寶), these coins were all issued in the conquered lands of the former Jin dynasty and are subsequently known as frontier or border area coins. After the Song dynasty fell to the Mongols new coins started being issued.

'Phags-pa script was the official script of Yuan dynasty. Mongolian language on all coins were written in the 'Phags-pa script instead of traditional Mongolian script.

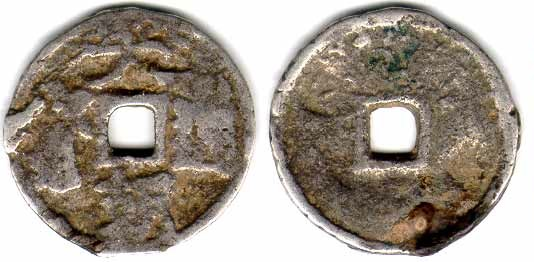
Da Chao Tong Bao (大朝通寶) Silver coins.

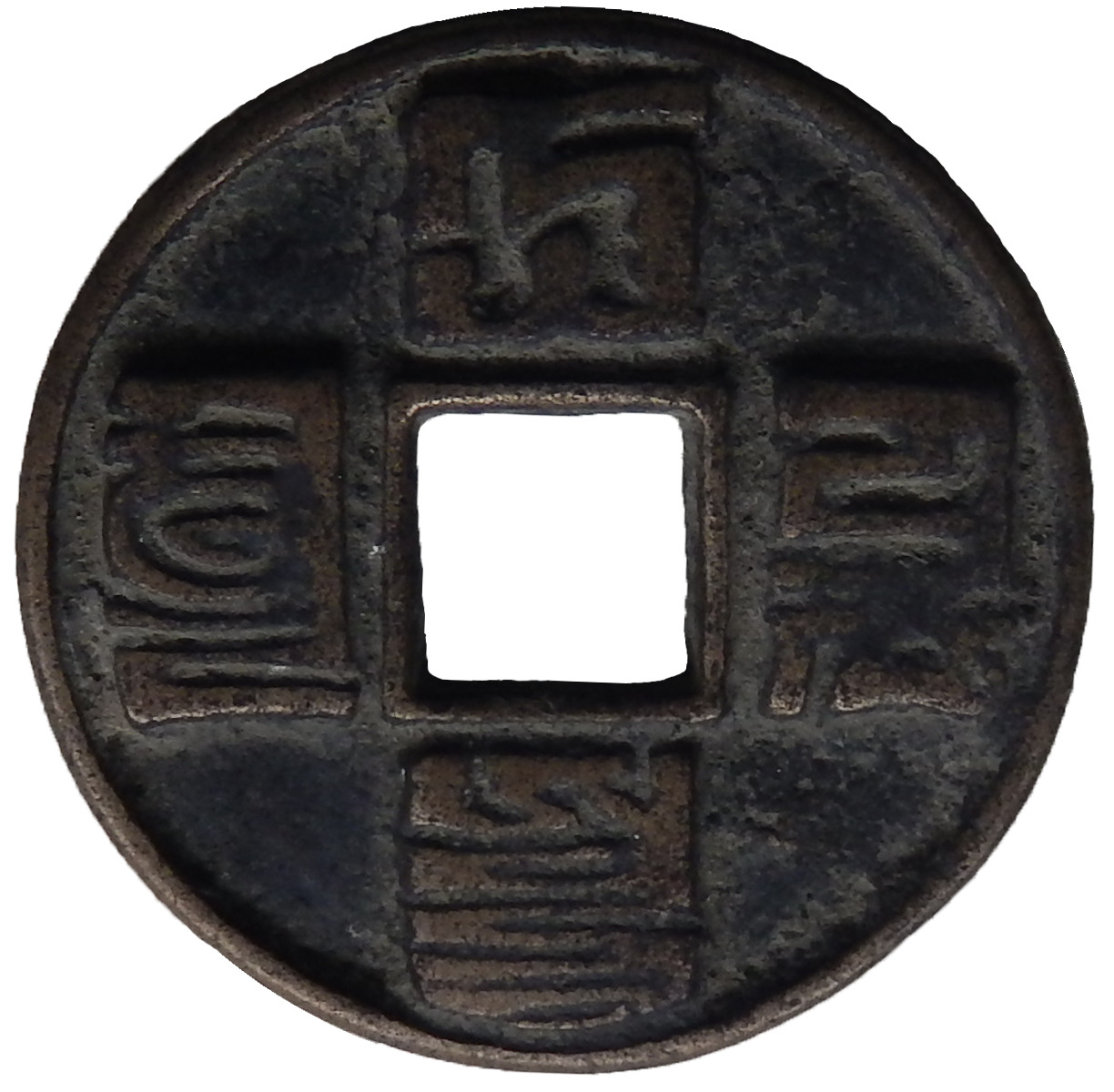
A Da Yuan Tong Bao (大元通寶) coin written in 'Phags-pa script held at the Great Wall of China Museum Beijing.

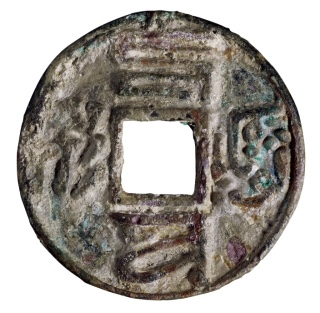
A Zhi Yuan Tong Bao (至元通寶) coin written in four scripts.

List of coins issued by the Mongols during Yuan dynasty:

Inscription	Traditional Chinese	Script (Note: Chinese, or 'Phags-pa scripts would generally appear on the obverse of these coins, while Mongol ʼPhags-pa script would appear on the reverse and would serve as a mint mark (and in one instance the Chagatai and Tangut scripts); Kublai Khan's Zhong Tong Yuan Bao (中統元寶) was the only coin that contained Seal script, all other Chinese inscriptions during the Mongol period were written in regular script)	Khagan (Mongolian name)	Emperor (Mandarin Chinese name)
Zhong Tong Yuan Bao	中統元寶	Chinese script (Regular script and Seal script), Mongol 'Phags-pa script	Kublai Khan	Shìzǔ (世祖)
Zhi Yuan Tong Bao	至元通寶	Chinese script, Mongol 'Phags-pa script	Kublai Khan	Shìzǔ (世祖)
Yuan Zhen Tong Bao	元貞通寶	Chinese script, Mongol 'Phags-pa script	Temür Khan	Chéngzōng (成宗)
Yuan Zhen Yuan Bao	元貞元寶	Chinese script, Mongol 'Phags-pa script	Temür Khan	Chéngzōng (成宗)
Da De Tong Bao	大德通寶	Chinese script, Mongol 'Phags-pa script	Temür Khan	Chéngzōng (成宗)
Zhi Da Tong Bao	至大通寶	Chinese script, Mongol 'Phags-pa script	Külüg Khan	Wǔzōng (武宗)
Zhi Da Yuan Bao	至大元寶	Chinese script	Külüg Khan	Wǔzōng (武宗)
Da Yuan Tong Bao	大元通寶	Chinese script, Mongol 'Phags-pa script	Külüg Khan	Wǔzōng (武宗)
Huang Qing Yuan Bao	皇慶元寶	Chinese script	Ayurbarwada Buyantu Khan	Rénzōng (仁宗)
Yan You Tong Bao	延祐通寶	Chinese script	Ayurbarwada Buyantu Khan	Rénzōng (仁宗)
Yan You Yuan Bao	延祐元寶	Chinese script	Ayurbarwada Buyantu Khan	Rénzōng (仁宗)
Zhi Zhi Tong Bao	至治通寶	Chinese script	Gegeen Khan	Yīngzōng (英宗)
Zhi Zhi Yuan Bao	至治元寶	Chinese script	Gegeen Khan	Yīngzōng (英宗)
Tai Ding Tong Bao	泰定通寶	Chinese script	Yesün Temür	
Tai Ding Yuan Bao	泰定元寶	Chinese script	Yesün Temür	
Zhi He Yuan Bao	致和元寶	Chinese script	Yesün Temür	
Tian Li Yuan Bao	天曆元寶	Chinese script	Jayaatu Khan Tugh Temür	Wénzōng (文宗)
Zhi Shun Yuan Bao	至順元寶	Chinese script	Jayaatu Khan Tugh Temür	Wénzōng (文宗)
Yuan Tong Yuan Bao	元統元寶	Chinese script	Toghon Temür	Huìzōng (惠宗)
Zhi Yuan Tong Bao	至元通寶	Chinese script, Mongol ʼPhags-pa script, Chagatai script, Tangut script	Toghon Temür	Huìzōng (惠宗)
Zhi Yuan Yuan Bao	至元元寶	Chinese script	Toghon Temür	Huìzōng (惠宗)
Mu Qing Tóng Bao	穆清銅寶	Chinese script	Toghon Temür	Huìzōng (惠宗)
Zhi Zheng Tong Bao	至正通寶	Chinese script, Mongol 'Phags-pa script	Toghon Temür	Huìzōng (惠宗)
Zhi Zheng Zhi Bao	至正之寶	Chinese script	Toghon Temür	Huìzōng (惠宗)

== Rebel coinages ==
During the Red Turban rebellion organised by the White Lotus society; many of its leaders proclaimed their own kingdoms and empires that ruled over different regions of China, the most successful of these was Zhu Yuanzhang’s Ming dynasty which would unify China. Though the majority of these countries were short-lived some did produce their own coinage.

Inscription	Traditional Chinese	Simplified Chinese	Denominations	Years of mintage	Monarch	Rebel faction
Long Feng Tong Bao	龍鳳通寶	龙凤通宝	1文, 2文, 3文, 5文	1355-1366	Han Lin’er (韓林兒)	Early Red Turban rebellion
Tian You Tong Bao	天佑通寶	天佑通宝	1文, 2文, 3文, 5文	1354-1357	Zhang Shicheng (張士誠)	Kingdom of Great(er) Zhou (大周)
Tian Qi Tong Bao	天啟通寶	天启通宝	1文, 2文, 3文	1358	Xu Shouhui (徐壽輝)	Tianwan (天完)
Tian Ding Tong Bao	天定通寶	天定通宝	1文, 2文, 3文	1359-1360	Xu Shouhui (徐壽輝)	Tianwan (天完)
Da Yi Tong Bao	大義通寶	大义通宝	1文, 2文, 3文	1360-1361	Chen Youliang (陳友諒)	Kingdom of Dahan (大漢)

== See also ==
- Pūl (coin)
- Soum
- History of Chinese currency
- Zhou dynasty coinage
- Liao dynasty coinage
- Southern Song dynasty coinage
- Western Xia coinage
- Jin dynasty coinage (1115-1234)
- Ming dynasty coinage
- Qing dynasty coinage

== Sources ==
- Watt, James, ed. (2010). The World of Khubilai Khan: Chinese Art in the Yuan Dynasty. New York City: Metropolitan Museum.
- Shinpan kaisei, Kosen nedantsuke, Narabi ni bantsuki (Improved New Edition: Price List of Old Coins, Together with Rarity Ranking), printed in the city of Nagoya, Tokugawa Shogunate (Japan) in 1799.
- Hartill, David (2005). Cast Chinese Coins. Trafford, United Kingdom: Trafford Publishing. ISBN 978-1412054669.
- Nyaama, Badarch (2005). The Coins of Mongol Empire and Clan Tamghas of Khans (XIII-XIV). Ulaanbaatar. (in English and Mongolian).

Preceded by: Southern Song dynasty coinage Reason: Mongol conquest of the Song dynasty.	Currency of China; 1271 – 1368; Note: Paper money was more commonly used.	Succeeded by: Ming dynasty coinage Reason: Red Turban Rebellion.
Preceded by: Western Xia coinage Reason: Mongol conquest of Western Xia.	Currency of China; 1271 – 1368; Note: Paper money was more commonly used.	Succeeded by: Ming dynasty coinage Reason: Red Turban Rebellion.
Preceded by: Jin dynasty coinage Reason: Mongol conquest of the Jin dynasty.	Currency of China; 1271 – 1368; Note: Paper money was more commonly used.	Succeeded by: Ming dynasty coinage Reason: Red Turban Rebellion.
