= Western Xia coinage =

Historical coinage of China

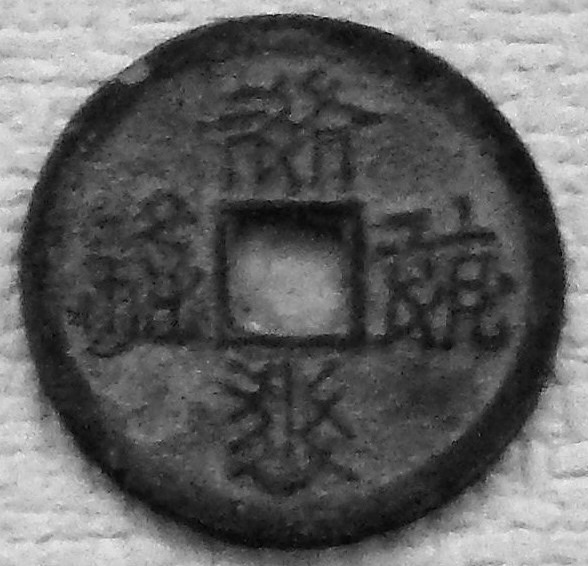
A tshjwu ꞏwu ljɨ̣ dzjɨj (𘀗𘑨𘏨𘔭) or Qian You Bao Qian (Chinese: 乾佑寶錢) cash coin written in the Tangut script.

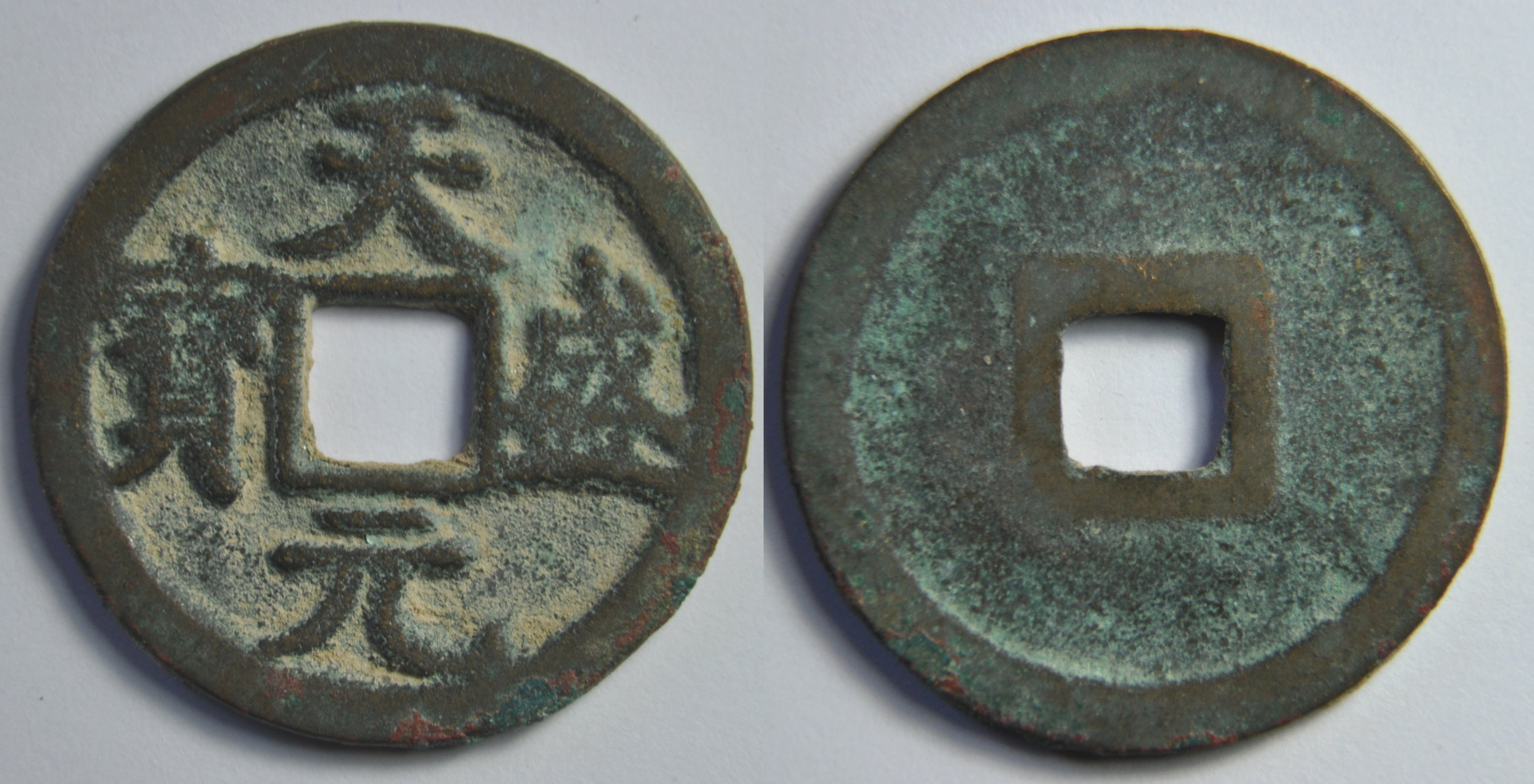
A Tian Sheng Yuan Bao (天盛元寶) coin issued under Emperor Renzong.

The Western Xia was a Tangut-led Chinese dynasty which ruled over what are now the northwestern Chinese subdivisions of Ningxia, Gansu, eastern Qinghai, northern Shaanxi, northeastern Xinjiang, southwest Inner Mongolia, and southernmost Outer Mongolia from 1032 until 1227 when they were destroyed by the Mongols. The country was established by the Tangut people; likewise its earliest coins were escribed with Tangut characters, while later they would be written in Chinese. Opposed to Song dynasty coins that often read top-bottom-right-left, Western Xia coins exclusively read clockwise. Despite the fact that coins had been cast for over a century and a half, very little were actually produced and coins from Western Xia are a rarity today. Although the Western Xia cast their own coins barter remained widely used.

Originally from 1053 until 1068 the inscription of its cash coins were exclusively written in the Tangut script, and between 1068 and 1206 coins were cast with both Tangut and Chinese inscriptions, but after 1206 only Chinese characters were used. Compared to Liao dynasty coinage, coins from Western Xia were cast in superior quality, though only bronze and iron coins produced between 1149 and 1193 were cast in high quantities. The calligraphy of Western Xia period cash coins are typically regarded as being of fine quality.

After Western Xia was annexed by the Mongols, Tangut inscriptions appeared only on a single Yuan dynasty coin.

== History ==
Following the establishment of the Western Xia state, the Tangut people, in an effort to revive their original ethnic and national culture, had rejected both Chinese characters and Chinese fashion. The Tangut people had soon created an indigenous writing system, this writing system was exclusively used on the earlier Western Xia era cash coins. These early Tangut cash coins had inscriptions like śjɨj ljo ljɨ̣ dzjɨj (𗼃𗼕𘏨𘔭) and tha nej ljɨ̣ dzjɨj (𘜶𗵐𘏨𘔭). The Tangut script inscription on these early Western Xia cash coins always read clockwise (top-right-bottom-left), with all of these coins having inscriptions that translate into English as "Precious Coin of the" followed by the reign title. Cash coins with Tangut inscriptions are known to have been produced during six different reign periods, but it's possible that more variants have been produced.

Cash coins with Tangut inscriptions have been discovered in the modern era such as the Zhengde Baoqian type in the year 1999.

During the Qianyou period (1139–1193) of the reign of Emperor Renzong the political and military stability as well as the growing economy in Western Xia had allowed for the country to prosper. Emperor Renzong would hold education in a high esteem and was responsible for the establishment of schools including an Imperial Academy. Emperor Renzong had further established an imperial examination system in the style of that of the Chinese Empire. During the Qianyou era the Tangut government had also gained greater respect for both Confucian philosophy and the culture of the Song dynasty. Much art from the Western Xia Empire, including its coinage was largely based on that from China.

This era also saw the production of Song dynasty-style cash coins, these Song dynasty-style cash coins also followed the Song tradition of casting “Matched Coins” (對錢, duì qián, 對品, duì pǐn, 和合錢, hé hé qián), where two or more different Chinese calligraphy styles were used on cash coins that had the same Chinese era title (or reign period).

These Chinese calligraphic styles included clerical script, regular script, running script, grass script, and rarely seal script.

== List of coins produced by the Western Xia ==
The cash coins produced under the Western Xia were cast in either Tangut or Chinese.

Coins with Tangut inscriptions: (Note: The transliterations are those from Tangutologist Li Fanwen, as opposed to Hartill's usage "Lee Ndzen" and similar phonetics which are common in the numismatics community.)

Inscription (Tangut)	Inscription (Mandarin)	Traditional Chinese	Simplified Chinese	Years of casting	Emperor	Image
śjɨj ljo ljɨ̣ dzjɨj (𗼃𗼕𘏨𘔭)	Fu Sheng Bao Qian	福聖寶錢	福圣宝钱	1053–1056	Yizong	
tha nej ljɨ̣ dzjɨj (𘜶𗵐𘏨𘔭)	Da An Bao Qian	大安寶錢	大安宝钱	1074–1084	Huizong	
tśhja bio̲ ljɨ̣ dzjɨj (𗣼𘝯𘏨𘔭)	Zhen Guan Bao Qian	貞觀寶錢	贞观宝钱	1101–1113	Chongzong	
tśhja mji̲ ljɨ̣ dzjɨj (𗣼𘇚𘏨𘔭)	Zheng De Bao Qian	正德寶錢	正德宝钱	1127–1134	Chongzong	
tshjwu ꞏwu ljɨ̣ dzjɨj (𘀗𘑨𘏨𘔭)	Qian You Bao Qian	乾佑寶錢	乾佑宝钱	1170–1193	Renzong	
ŋwər ljwu ljɨ̣ dzjɨj (𘓺𘅝𘏨𘔭)	Tian Qing Bao Qian	天慶寶錢	天庆宝钱	1194–1206	Huanzong	

Coins with Chinese inscriptions:

Inscription	Traditional Chinese	Simplified Chinese	Script	Years of casting	Emperor	Image
Da An Tong Bao	大安通寶	大安通宝	Clerical script	1074–1084	Huizong	
Yuan De Tong Bao	元德通寶	元德通宝	Clerical script	1119–1126	Chongzong	
Da De Tong Bao	大德通寶	大德通宝	Regular script	1135–1139	Chongzong	
Tian Sheng Yuan Bao	天盛元寶	天盛元宝	Regular script	1149–1169	Renzong	
Qian You Yuan Bao	乾佑元寶	乾佑元宝	Regular script, Semi-cursive script, Seal script	1170–1193	Renzong	
Tian Qing Yuan Bao	天慶元寶	天庆元宝	Regular script	1194–1206	Huanzong	
Huang Jian Yuan Bao	皇建元寶	皇建元宝	Regular script	1210–1211	Xiangzong	
Guang Ding Yuan Bao	光定元寶	光定元宝	Semi-cursive script, Seal script	1211–1223	Shenzong	

== Usage of seal script on Western Xia cash coins ==
Many Chinese and other Oriental coin catalogues through the centuries had documented the cash coins that were cast by the Western Xia Empire to be in regular script or running scripts but not in seal script. This changed in September of the year 1984 with the discovery of a seal script Guangding Yuanbao cash coin and again in 2012 with the discovery of a seal script Qianyou Yuanbao cash coin. While a multitude of seal script Guangding Yuanbao cash coins have been discovered, only a single Qianyou Yuanbao cash coin has been known to exist.

Today these newly discovered variants have been added to newer Chinese coin catalogues as variants of the "matched cash coins" of the Western Xia Empire. In the modern era the discovery of a new Chinese coin variety is a rare occurrence to happen, so the discovery of the seal script Qianyou Yuanbao has caused a great amount of excitement among Chinese cash coinage collectors.

=== Guangding Yuanbao ===
A rubbing of a Guangding Yuanbao (光定元寶) with an inscription that was written in seal script.

In early September of the year 1984 a cache of old cash coins was unearthed in the Ningxia Hui Autonomous Region, among these cash coins was a Guangding Yuanbao (光定元寶) with an inscription that was written in seal script. These cash coins were unearthed due to Helanshan flash floods which occurred near Yinchuan, which was historically known as Xingqing and was the capital city of the Western Xia Empire. Among the cash coins unearthed during this event were Han, Tang, Song, Khitan Liao, Jurchen Jin, and many other types of cash coins. The rarest earlier documented coins found after these flash floods were Liao dynasty coins and gold coins, but at the time the seal script Guangding Yuanbao was never seen before and thought to be unique. This first seal script Guangding Yuanbao cash coin has a diameter of 25.3 millimeters, a thickness of 1.4 millimeters, and a weight of 4.3 grams.

In the year 2002 a second specimen was dug up in the province of Shaanxi, this was followed by the discovery of a third specimen found in Inner Mongolia. Later excavations in the Tongxin County, Ningxia Hui Autonomous Region had brought this number up to more than ten.

=== Qianyou Yuanbao ===
A rubbing of the unique Qianyou Yuanbao (乾佑元寶) with a seal script inscription.

For a long it was believed that the Guangding Yuanbao cash coins produced towards the very end of the Western Xia period were the only cash coins with seal script inscriptions produced by the empire. However, in the 2012, a Chinese farmer had uncovered a cache of Western Xia era cash coins in Tongxin County, Ningxia Hui Autonomous Region and among these cash coins was a unique Qianyou Yuanbao (乾佑元寶) with a seal script inscription. This cash coin has a diameter of 25.4 millimeters, a thickness of 1.5 millimeters and has a weight of 3.3 grams, its inscription is read clockwise.

Dr. Zhu Hu (朱浒) of the Art Research Institute of East China Normal University published in “Volume One of China Numismatics” (simplified Chinese: 中国钱币2016年1期; traditional Chinese: 中國錢幣 2016年1期; pinyin: zhōng guó qián bì èr qiān liù shí liù nián yì qī) an assessment of this cash coin. According to Dr. Zhu Hu this cash coin is inspired by the seal script "matched cash coins" from the Northern Song dynasty. Dr. Zhu Hu notes that the seal script character "You" (祐) is written in the same method as that of the Jingyou Yuanbao (景祐元寶), Jiayou Yuanbao (嘉祐元寶), and the Yuanyou Tongbao (元祐通寶) cash issued by the Song dynasty in the course of a century from the tenth century until the twelfth century. While the seal script characters "Yuan" (元) and "Bao" (寶) similar to the "Yuan" and "Bao" characters found on the Xuanhe Yuanbao (宣和元寶), and its "Bao" (寶) character looks similar to that of the seal script version of the Zhenghe Tongbao (政和通寶).

The discovery of this unique seal script Qianyou Yuanbao cash coin also means that this inscription is the only Western Xia Empire cash coin that is known to exist in three different Chinese calligraphic varieties, in the form of regular script, running script, and seal script.

According to Gary Ashkenazy from the website Primaltrek, he claims that the fact that this unique seal script Qianyou Yuanbao cash coin is very well-made, in his opinion lends credence to the speculation that this coin might have been cast as a trial piece, or pattern coin, and that only very few cash coins with this inscription and calligraphic style might have been actually cast for general circulation.

=== Differences in style between the seal script Guangding Yuanbao and Qianyou Yuanbao cash coins ===
The seal script "Yuan" (元) character of the Guangding Yuanbao cash coins tends to have more "twists and turns" than the more "dignified" version of the "Yuan" on the seal script version of the Qianyou Yuanbao, furthermore, the "Yuan" character inscribed on the bottom of the Guangding Yuanbao touches the rim of the coin, which the "Yuan" on the Qianyou Yuanbao doesn't touch the rim of the coin. Another difference between these two cash coins is the fact that the "crown" of the seal script "Bao" (宝) character of the Guangding Yuanbao has a more "square" shape compared to the more "round" shape of the "Bao" found on the seal script version of the Qianyou Yuanbao.

All of these differentiating characteristics are also found on the seal script "matched cash coins" produced by the Song dynasty.

== Hoards of Western Xia cash coins ==
- In the year 1972 a Da'an Baoqian (大安寶錢, 𘜶𗵐𘏨𘔭) cash coin with Tangut script was found at the Liao Shangjing site, Lindong, Baarin Left Banner, Inner Mongolia.

== See also ==
- History of Chinese currency
- Zhou dynasty coinage
- Ancient Chinese coinage
- Liao dynasty coinage
- Southern Song dynasty coinage
- Jin dynasty coinage (1115–1234)
- Yuan dynasty coinage
- Ming dynasty coinage
- Qing dynasty coinage

== Sources ==
- 1994. “西夏的衡制與幣制 Xixia de hengzhi yu bizhi (The weight and coin systems of the West Xia)” 《中國錢幣》 Zhongguo qianbi / China Numanistics 1994.1: 3-8,17, 81 (in Mandarin)
- 2002. “西夏货币制度概述 (The Outline of monetary system of West Xia dynasty).” 《中國錢幣》 Zhongguo qianbi / China Numanistics 2002.3:43-46 (in Mandarin)
- Hartill, David (September 22, 2005). Cast Chinese Coins. Trafford, United Kingdom: Trafford Publishing. ISBN 978-1412054669.
- Niú Dáshēng (牛达生) Research into Western Xia Coins. (2013)

Preceded by: Ancient Chinese coinage Reason: Independence.	Currency of China (Gansu); 1038 – 1227	Succeeded by: Yuan dynasty coinage Reason: Mongol conquest
