= Jin dynasty coinage (1115–1234) =

Historical coinage of China

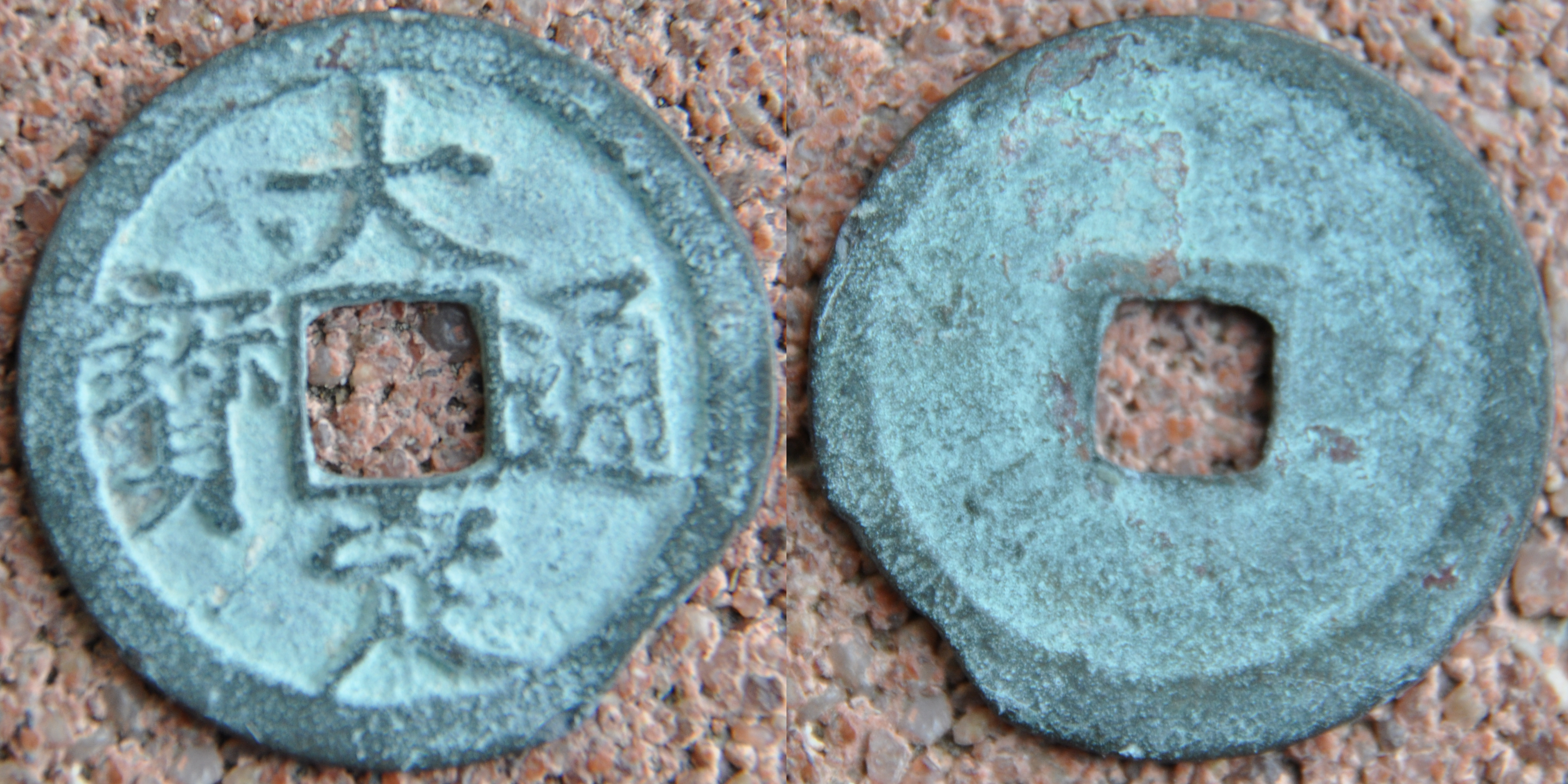
A Da Ding Tong Bao (Chinese: 大定通寶) coin cast under Emperor Shizong.

The Jin dynasty was a Jurchen-led dynasty of China that ruled over northern China and Manchuria from 1115 until 1234. After the Jurchens defeated the Liao dynasty and the Northern Song dynasty, they would continue to use their coins for day to day usage in the conquered territories. In 1234, they were conquered by the Mongol Empire (which later evolved into the Yuan dynasty; further reading: Yuan dynasty coinage).

== History ==
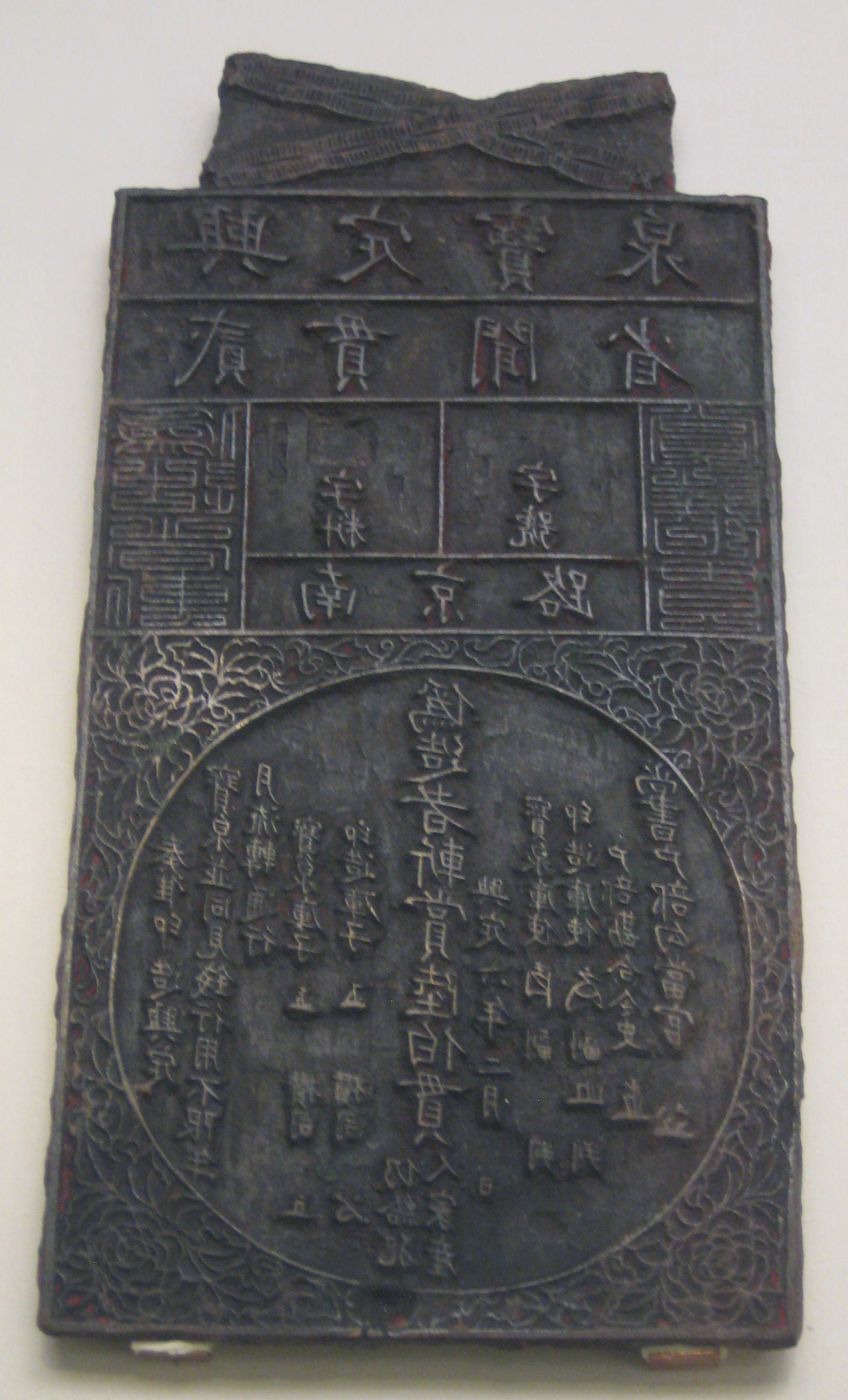
Bronze plate for printing the Xingding era paper currency. Jin dynasty, 2nd year if the Xingding era (1218).

Although the Jin dynasty had started issuing paper Jiaochao (交鈔) in 1154, they didn't produce coins until the year 1158, prior to that coins from the preceding Liao and Song dynasties continued to circulate within Jurchen territory, as well as a continuing large inflow of coins produced by the Song, this was because the territory of the Jin didn't have enough copper to meet the demand. Jin era coins circulated alongside paper money and silver sycees, and were the main medium of exchange for the general population.

In the beginning iron coins continued to circulate but this had become to be perceived as an inconvenience so the Jin government ordered the immediate ban on melting down copper for usage other than currency, and was quick to open more copper mines to manage the production of copper coinage. 3 mints were opened that together produced 140,000 strings of coins a year (or 140,000,000 cash coins annually), after inflation had become a problem this production became less profitable for the Jin government.

Coins produced by the Jin dynasty compared to earlier Liao dynasty coinage are both of higher quality, and quantity; this is because the Jurchens chose to model their coins more closely after the Song’s both in production as superficially in its calligraphic style. The Taihe Zhongbao (泰和重寶) were cast with a very special and particular style of calligraphy known as jade tendon seal script.

Due to the constant Mongol invasions and high military expenditures, coins cast after 1209 had become a rarity.

== List of coins produced by the Jin dynasty ==
Coins produced by the Jurchen Jin dynasty include:

Inscription	Traditional Chinese	Simplified Chinese	Scripts	Years of minting	Emperor	Image
Zheng Long Yuan Bao	正隆元寶	正隆元宝	Regular script	1158–1161	Wanyan Liang	
Da Ding Tong Bao	大定通寶	大定通宝	Regular script	1178–1189	Shizong	
Tai He Tong Bao	泰和通寶	泰和通宝	Regular script	1204–1209	Zhangzong	
Tai He Zhong Bao	泰和重寶	泰和重宝	Regular script, Seal script	1204–1209	Zhangzong	
Chong Qing Tong Bao	崇慶通寶	崇庆通宝	Regular script	1212–1213	Wanyan Yongji	
Chong Qing Yuan Bao	崇慶元寶	崇庆元宝	Regular script	1212–1213	Wanyan Yongji	
Zhi Ning Yuan Bao	至寧元寶	至宁元宝	Regular script	1213	Wanyan Yongji	
Zhen You Tong Bao	貞祐通寶	贞佑通宝	Regular script	1213–1216	Xuanzong	
Zhen You Yuan Bao	貞祐元寶	贞佑元宝	Regular script	1213–1216	Xuanzong	

== Da Qi coinage ==
In 1130 during the Jin–Song Wars the Jin dynasty had set up a second puppet state called “Da Qi” (after the failed first puppet state, Da Chu), this puppet state briefly produced its own coins until it was defeated by the Song in 1137.

Coins produced by the brief Jurchen vassal state include:

Inscription	Traditional Chinese	Simplified Chinese	Script	Emperor	Image
Fu Chang Tong Bao	阜昌通寶	阜昌通宝	Regular script, Seal script	Liu Yu	
Fu Chang Yuan Bao	阜昌元寶	阜昌元宝	Regular script, Seal script	Liu Yu	
Fu Chang Zhong Bao	阜昌重寶	阜昌重宝	Regular script, Seal script	Liu Yu	

== Eastern Xia coinage ==
According to information from an attempted seller, in a small coin hoard in the Russian Far East in 2011 new seven cash coins were discovered, these coins bore the inscription Dongzhen Xingbao (東眞興寶) alluding to a rebel state named Eastern Xia that was founded during the Mongol conquest of the Jin dynasty.

== See also ==
- Ancient Chinese coinage
- History of Chinese currency
- Liao dynasty coinage
- Ming dynasty coinage
- Qing dynasty coinage
- Southern Song dynasty coinage
- Western Xia coinage
- Yuan dynasty coinage
- Zhou dynasty coinage

Preceded by: Liao dynasty coinage Reason: Jurchen conquest of the Liao dynasty.	Currency of Northern China; 1115 – 1234	Succeeded by: Yuan dynasty coinage Reason: Mongol conquest of the Jin dynasty.
