= 濟州 =

濟州 may refer to:

- Jeju
- Jizhou
