= Chichow =

Chichow may refer to:

== Locations in China ==
- Jizhou (disambiguation)
- Qizhou (disambiguation)

== Locations in Iran ==
- Chu Chun, a village in Iran
