= Jizhou =

Jizhou may refer to:

- Jizhou District, Hengshui (冀州区), Hebei
  - Jizhou Town (冀州镇), subdivision of Jizhou District, Hengshui
- Jizhou District, Ji'an (吉州区), Jiangxi
- Jizhou District, Tianjin (蓟州区)

== Historical locations ==
- Ji Province (冀州), one of the Nine Provinces in ancient China
- Ji Prefecture (Shandong) (濟州), a prefecture in modern Shandong, China between the 10th and 14th centuries

== See also ==
- Jeju (disambiguation) — Korean equivalent
- Ji (disambiguation)
