= Great Qing Gold Coin =

Series of unissued Chinese coins

Great Qing Gold Coin (大清金幣)
- China (Qing dynasty)
- Value: 1 Kuping tael
- Mass: 37.5 g
- Diameter: 39.5 mm
- Composition: Gold
- Years of minting: 1906–1907 (trial issues)
- Circulation: No

Obverse
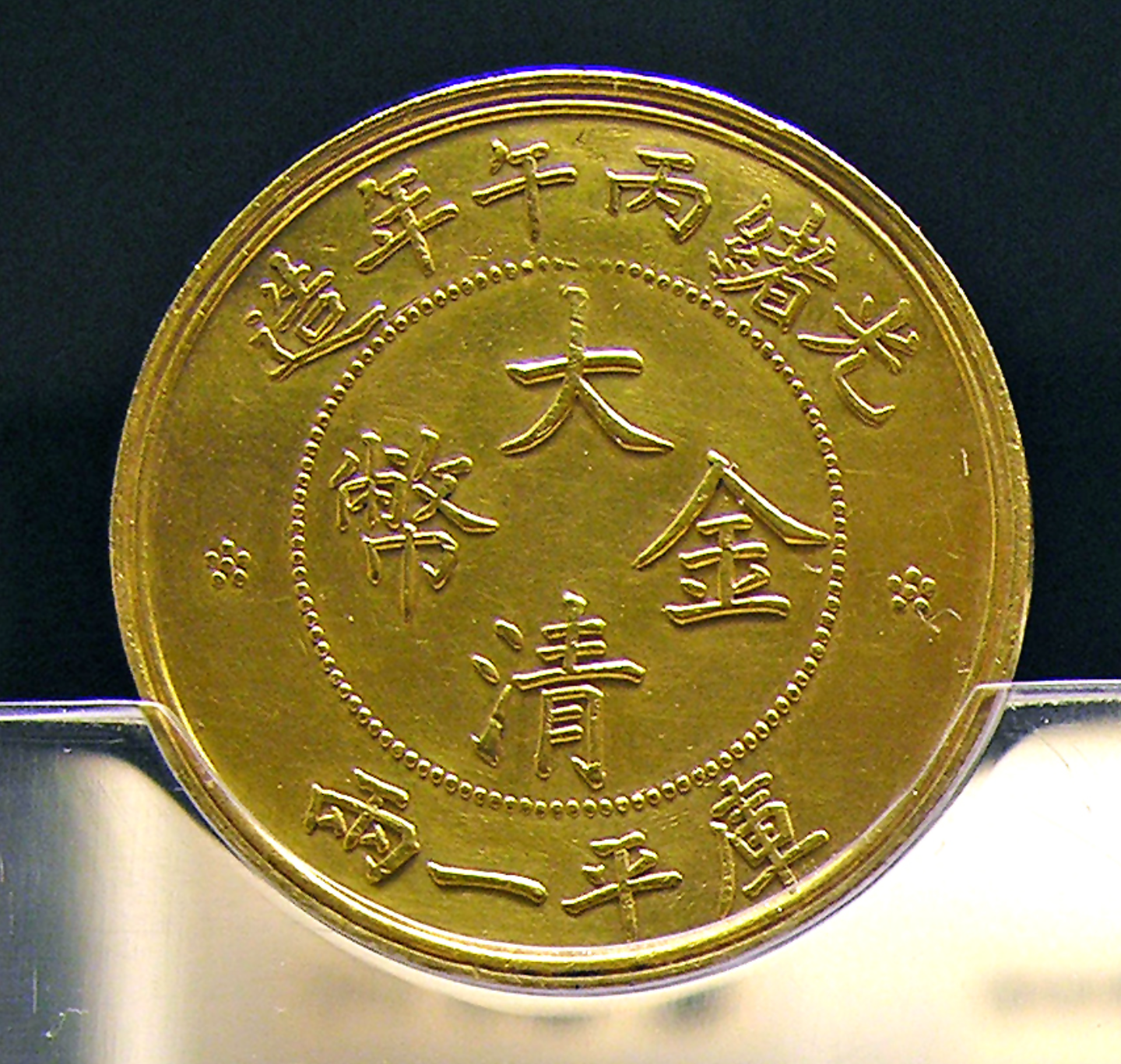
- Design: 光緒(丙午/丁未)年造 - 大清金幣 - 庫平一兩

Reverse
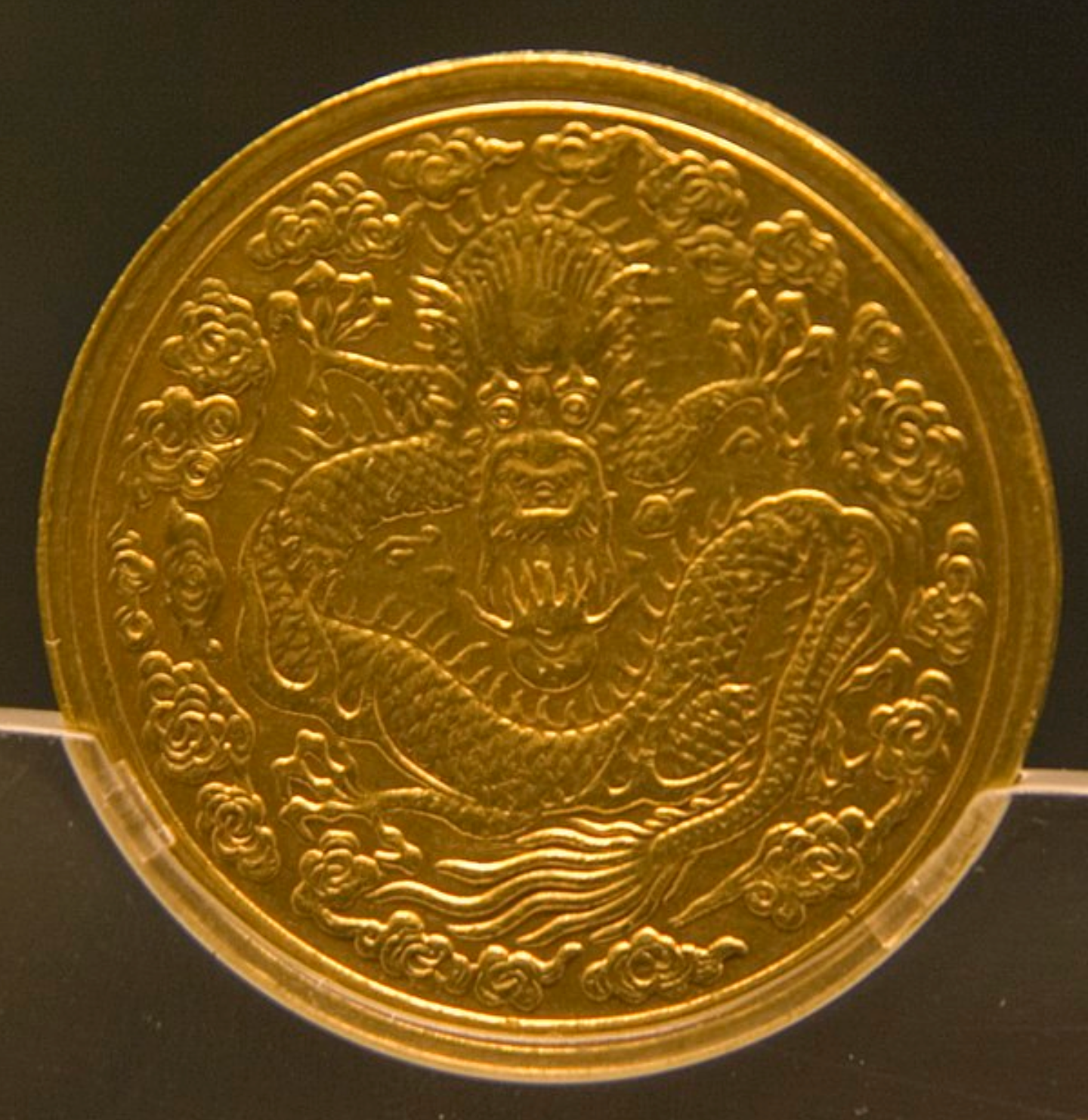
- Design: A large dragon chasing a wish-granting pearl surrounded by auspicious clouds.

The Great Qing Gold Coin (simplified Chinese: 大清金币; traditional Chinese: 大清金幣; pinyin: Dà Qīng Jīn Bì), also known as the Qing Dynasty Gold Coin or Da-Qing Jinbi, was the name of an unissued series of gold coins produced under the reign of the Guangxu Emperor of the Manchu-led Qing dynasty. These coins were produced in the scenario that the government of the Qing dynasty would adopt the gold standard, as was common in most of the world at the time.

During the Qing dynasty, the Chinese coinage system was based on a bimetallic system of copper and silver and these proposed coins would have also introduced gold coinage to China. However, only a small number of trial coins were produced in the years 1906 and 1907, despite the production these pattern coins the Great Qing Gold Coin did not ever see any circulation.

== History ==
The Qing dynasty used a bimetallic currency system based on silver sycees and cast copper-alloy cash coins and during the 19th century modern machine-struck coinage from the Western world inspired the local production of milled coinages by provincial governments. The first of these being provincial issues of the Guangxu Yuanbao (光緒元寶) which would later inspire the government of the Qing dynasty to standardise its currency nationwide due to the different weights and standards being used across China.

During the later years of the Manchu Qing dynasty, the coinage system was scattered with central government-made coins, local coins and some foreign currencies circulating together in the private sector of China, resulting in a great deal of currency confusion, this has made both fiscal and financial management in China quite difficult. In an attempt to bring order to this chaos some people such as Chen Zhi started advocating for China to place its currency on the gold standard. The reformer Liang Qichao campaigned for the government of the Qing dynasty to emulate the Western world and Japan by embracing the gold standard, unify refractory the currencies of China, and issue government-backed banknotes with a ⅓ metallic reserve.

In the year Guangxu 29 (1903) the Ministry of Revenue in Beijing had authorised a small number of gold 1 Kuping tael Guangxu Yuanbao pattern coins with the English inscription "29TH YEAR OF KUANG HSÜ - HU POO", the dies for these coins were probably produced at the Japan Mint in Osaka, Japan. In the year Guangxu 30 (1904) the Ministry of Revenue created a concrete implementation for the manufacture of gold coins, while in Guangxu 31 (1905) the government of the Qing dynasty reformed the currency system to allow for gold coins, these would be cast by the Tianjin General Mint operated by the Ministry of Revenue with the inscription "Great Qing Gold Coin" (大清金幣), These coins bore a similar inscription to the copper-alloy Great Qing Copper Coin (大清銅幣) and the silver Great Qing Silver Coin (大清銀幣), which were both introduced to standardise the national coinages in their respective metals.

Only a small number of trial coins with this inscription were ever cast that were not meant for general circulation as the gold reserves of the Qing dynasty proved insufficient. These coins weighed 1 Kuping Tael and were cast in the years Guangxu 32 (1906) and Guangxu 33 (1907) and featured a design of a Chinese dragon on one side and the inscription on the other with the year of casting shown in Chinese cyclical years.

Because of the scarce production of these coins, the Great Qing Gold Coins have been sold at auctions at high prices, during the 2010s a 1907 the Great Qing Gold Coin was estimated to be worth between $80,000 and $100,000. In 2006 a Great Qing Gold Coin was sold for RMB 2,090,000, in 2007 a 1907 Great Qing Gold Coin was sold for RMB 1,904,000 and another for RMB 1,064,000, in the year 2008 a 1906 Great Qing Gold Coin was sold for RMB 1,792,000, in 2013 a 1906 Great Qing Gold Coin was sold for RMB 1,150,000, and in 2014 a 1906 Great Qing Gold Coin was sold for RMB 897,000 at an auction in Beijing.

== Design ==
The obverse of the Great Qing Gold Coin featured the Traditional Chinese characters "大清金幣" which could be translated as "Gold Coin of the Great Qing" in its centre, on the top of the coin was the date of manufacture using both the Chinese calendar date and the reign era of the Guangxu Emperor, 1906 coins had the text "造年午丙緒光" written from right to left, while 1907 coins featured the text "造年未丁緒光". At the bottom of the coin was the text "兩一平庫" written from right to left indicating that the weight of the coin was 1 Kuping Tael (or 37.5 grams) of gold. The reverse of these coins depicted a large Chinese dragon chasing the wish-granting pearl surrounded by auspicious clouds.

Variants of the Great Qing Gold Coin
Year (Chinese calendar)	Year (Gregorian calendar)	Year (Chinese era name)	Image
光緒丙午年造	1906	Guangxu 32	
光緒丁未年造	1907	Guangxu 33	
