= Qing dynasty coinage =

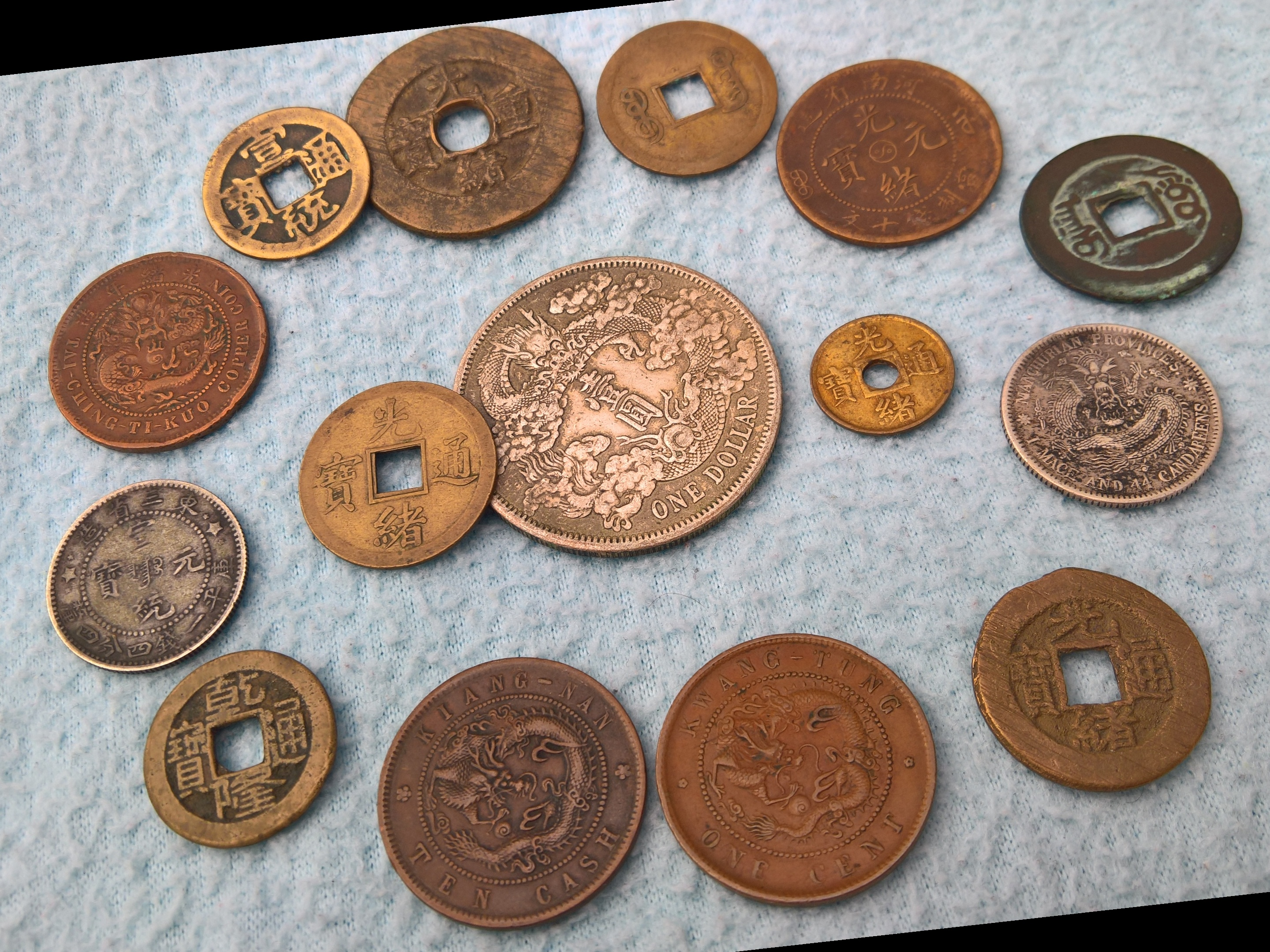
Late Qing coins produced during the reigns of the Qianlong (r. 1735–1796), Guangxu (r. 1871–1908) and Xuantong (r. 1908–1912) emperors

Qing dynasty coinage (Note: traditional Chinese: 清朝貨幣; simplified Chinese: 清朝货币; pinyin: Qīngcháo huòbì; Manchu: ᡩᠠᡳᠴᡳᠩ ᠵᡳᡴᠠ, romanized: Daicing jiha) was based on a bimetallic standard of copper and silver coinage. The Manchu-led Qing dynasty was proclaimed in 1636 and ruled over China proper from 1644 until its overthrow in 1912 as a result of the Xinhai Revolution. The Qing saw the transformation of a traditional cash coin–based cast coinage monetary system into a modern currency system with machine-struck coins, while the old traditional silver ingots would slowly be replaced by silver coins based on those of the Mexican peso. After the Qing dynasty was abolished, its currency was replaced by the Chinese yuan of the Republic of China.

== Later Jin dynasty coinage (1616–1636) ==
Prior to the establishment of the Qing dynasty, the Aisin Gioro clan established the Later Jin dynasty, named after the Jin dynasty of the Wanyan clan. Nurhaci had united the many tribes of the Jianzhou and Haixi Jurchens under the leadership of the Aisin Gioro clan, and later ordered the creation of the Manchu script based on the Mongolian vertical script. In 1636, Hong Taiji renamed the realm as "Great Qing", and the Jurchen people as the Manchu people, while adopting policies which fostered ethnic inclusivity.

In 1616, the Later Jin began producing their own cash coins; the coins issued under Nurhaci were written in an older version of the Manchu script without any diacritics, and generally bigger than Later Jin coins with Chinese inscriptions. Under Hong Taiji these coins bore the legend that they had a nominal weight of 10 qián (or 1 tael) modelled after contemporary Ming dynasty coinage, but in reality weighed less.

The following coins were issued by the Later Jin:

| Inscription | Latin script | Denominations | Years of mintage | Image | Khan |
|---|---|---|---|---|---|
| Manchu: ᠠᠪᡴᠠᡳ ᡶᡠᠯᡳᠩᡤᠠ ᡥᠠᠨ ᠵᡳᡴᠠ | Abkai fulingga han jiha | 1 wén | 1616–1626 | | Abkai fulingga Khan |
| 天命通寳 | Tiān Mìng Tōng Bǎo | 1 wén | 1616–1626 | | Abkai fulingga Khan |
| Manchu: ᠰᡠᡵᡝ ᡥᠠᠨ ᠨᡳ ᠵᡳᡴᠠ | Sure han ni jiha | 10 wén | 1627–1643 | | Sure Khan |

== History ==
In 1644, the Qing dynasty captured Beijing from the Shun dynasty, and then marched south capturing the forces loyal to the Ming. One of the first monetary policies they enacted was accepting Ming dynasty cash coins at only half the value of Qing dynasty cash coins, because of this Ming era coinage was removed from circulation to be melted into Qing dynasty coinage, this is why in modern times even Song dynasty coins are more common than those from the more recent Ming dynasty.

=== Early history ===
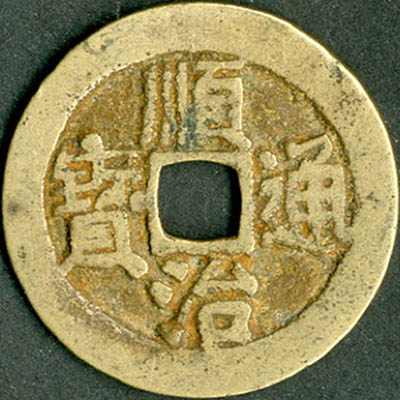
A Shùn Zhì Tōng Bǎo (順治通寶) coin, the first series of Qing dynasty coins minted outside of Manchuria.

At first the Qing government set the exchange rate between bronze and silver at 1 wén of bronze per lí (釐, or 厘) of silver, and 1000 lí of silver would be 1 tael (两), thus one string of 1000 bronze cash coins equated to a single tael of silver.

The Shunzhi Emperor created the Ministry of Revenue and the Ministry of Public Works in Beijing to oversee the casting of bronze cash coins, these ministries produced 400,000 strings of cash coins annually. Later the Shunzhi Emperor ordered military garrisons to start minting their own coinage, and though the official weight for cash coins was first set at 1 qián, in 1645 this increased to 1.2 qián, and by 1651 this had become 1.25 qián. In 1660 the order was given to re-open provincial mints and have them cast their mint names in Manchu script. The standard copper-alloy was 60% copper and 40% lead and/or zinc, yet diverse market conditions dictated what would be the de facto composition. This official composition was officially changed over time, initially it was at a ratio of 3:2 (3 parts copper to 2 parts lead and zinc).

The coins produced under the Shunzhi Emperor were modeled after Tang dynasty Kai Yuan Tong Bao coins, as well as early Ming dynasty coins, and have a Chinese mint mark on their reverses these were produced from 1644 until 1661, though these coins had a large range of mint marks from various provinces all over China, from 1644 until 1645 there were also Shùn Zhì Tōng Bǎo (順|治通寶) coins being cast with blank reverses.

=== Yongzheng era ===
Under the Yongzheng Emperor various measures were undertaken to ensure a vast supply of cash coins, though the weight was increased to 1.4 qián per wén, the copper content was lowered from 60% to 50% in 1727. In 1726 the Ministry of Revenue was split into 4 agencies each named after a wind direction, and in 1728 all provincial mints were ordered to open again as only the mint of Yunnan was operating prior to this order, and finally in 1728 the Ministry of Public Works mint was split into a "new Ministry of Public Works mint", and an "old Ministry of Public Works mint". Though by 1733 the Qing government realised that the costs of making standard cash coins at a weight of 1.4 qián was too much, so they lowered it back to 1.2 qián.

In 1725 the province of Yunnan had 47 operating furnaces. In 1726 the governour of Yunnan, Ortai made the province's coin minting industry more profitable by implementing new systems for regular, and supplemental casting as well as for casting scrap metal making sure that only regular cast coins would carry full production costs, he also closed down mints in the province with a lower production efficiency and started exporting Yunnan's coins to other provinces. This system proved so successful that other provinces started to adopt these reforms.

=== Jiaqing era ===
Under the Jiaqing Emperor the Chinese population had reached 300,000,000 which was twice as much as just a century prior, famines had plagued the land, the government was corrupt, and hordes of secret Anti-Manchu organisations popped up everywhere, stability would not return until 1803 but this had come at tremendously high costs. The Qing government started to increase quotas for the production of copper cash coins while constantly changing the standard content of the alloys beginning with 60% copper, and 40% zinc in 1796 to 54% copper, 43% zinc, and 3% lead not long after. Corruption plagued the provincial mints, and the exchange rate between cash and taels rose from 900 wén for 1 tael of silver to 1200 wén for a single tael, this was also due to a large outflow of silver to European and American merchants which pressured the Chinese monetary system. Under the Jiaqing Emperor an annual quota of 2,586,000 strings of cash coins for production was set, but in reality this number was rarely met.

=== Daoguang era ===
Under the Daoguang Emperor China's silver reserves were depleting due to the trade of opium with other countries, and as Chinese cash coins were based on the silver standard this eventually lead to the debasement of Qing era cash coinage under Daoguang because the costs of producing cast copper coins was higher by about one third than the face value of the cast coins themselves, by 1845 2,000 wén was needed for a single tael of silver. Coins produced under the Daoguang Emperor tend to be diminutive compared to earlier Qing dynasty coinage because of this reason.

Under the Daoguang Emperor a new mint was established at Kucha in Xinjiang province with coins cast there bearing the mark "庫" as well as coins with the reverse side inscription of "新" to circulate within the aforementioned province that was far away from China proper.

Lin Zexu suggested in the year 1833 to create a series of Daoguang Tongbao (道光通寶) cash coins with a weight of 0.5 tael, and that two of these cash coins would be exchangeable for one tael of silver. But this proposal was not adopted.

=== Tongzhi era ===
For the first year of the Tongzhi Emperor he bore the reign name of "Qixiang" (祺祥), though a few coins with this inscription were cast they were never put into circulation. While the reign title "Qixiang" the 10 wén Daqian continued to be produced, for a brief period of time Daqian with the inscription Qixiang Zhongbao (祺祥重寶) were produced. Because the Qixiang era name was not used for that long, cash coins with this era date were cast for such a short time, that only a small number of the government mints produced cash coins with this inscription. These mints included the Ministry of Public Works Mint (寶源), the Ministry of Revenue Mint (寶泉), the Yunnan mint (寶雲), the Gansu mint (寶鞏), and the Suzhou mint (寶蘇).

Tongzhi's mother the Empress Dowager Cixi changed his reign name to Tongzhi in 1862. Tongzhi's reign saw the end of the Taiping rebellion and the beginning of a large Muslim revolt in Xinjiang. The era also saw the rise of the Self-Strengthening Movement which wanted to adopt western ideas into practice in China including reforming the monetary system.

The coins produced under the Tongzhi Emperor remained of inferior quality with the 10 wén coin being reduced from 4.4 to 3.2 qián in 1867. Copper shortages remained and illegal casting would only become a larger problem as the provincial mints remained closed or barely productive. The first machine-struck cash coins were also produced under the Tongzhi Emperor in Paris at the request of governour Zuo Zongtang in 1866, but the government of the Qing refused to introduce machine-made coinage.

=== Modernisation under the Guangxu Emperor ===
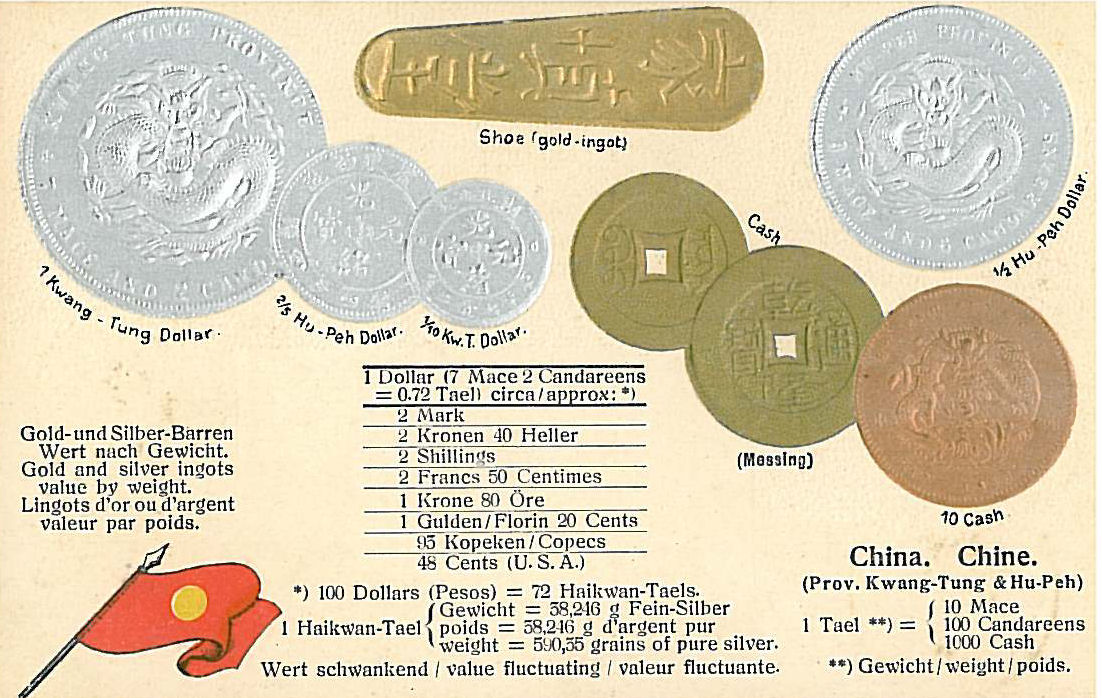
A postcard from 1900 showing the contemporary circulating Guangxu era Chinese coinage.

Under the Guangxu Emperor various attempts at reforming the Qing dynasty's currency system were implemented. Machine-made copper coins without square holes were introduced in Guangdong in 1899, and by 1906 15 machine operated mints operated in 12 provinces. The introduction of these machine-struck coins marked the beginning of the end of coin casting in China. In 1895 the Guangzhou Machine Mint had 90 presses becoming the largest mint in the world followed by the British Royal Mint with only 16 presses.

Many provinces were still slow to adopt machine mints, often due to the high costs associated with them, the machine mint of Tianjin cost 27,000 taels of silver but the cost of making a single string of machine-struck 1 qián cash coins more than twice as high as their face value forcing the Tianjin mint to buy more furnaces until it eventually had to close down in 1900.

Guangxu's reign saw the reclamation of Xinjiang and the presuming of minting red cash there, while Japanese experts revitalised the copper mining industry in Yunnan and many new veins of copper were discovered giving the government more resources to cast (and later strike) coins again.

The new coins often bore the inscription Guāng Xù Yuán Bǎo (光緒元寶) with an image of a Dragon and featured English, Chinese, and Manchu inscriptions. Further these coins tended to have their relation with China's older coinages (most often with cash coins) on the bottom, or their value in relation to silver coinage, and the Manchu words indicated the place of mintage. Meanwhile, the 10 wén "traditional" cash coins were discontinued as the production of these more modern coins began.

In 1906 the General Mint of the Ministry of the Interior and Finance in Tianjin started issuing a new copper coin called the Great Qing Copper Coin (大清銅幣), which like Guāng Xù Yuán Bǎo coins featured the image of a Chinese dragon, and had English, Chinese, and Manchu inscriptions with the English inscription reading "Tai-Ching-Ti-Kuo Copper Coin" in Wade-Giles, coins minted under the Guangxu Emperor featured the inscription of the Chinese characters Guāng Xù Nián Zào (光緒年造). These coins were minted in denominations of 2 wén, 5 wén, 10 wén, and 20 wén and would soon be issued by various mints across the Chinese provinces. These coins were first issued by the Ministry of the Interior and later by the Ministry of Revenue and Expenditure.

=== Coinage under the Xuantong Emperor ===
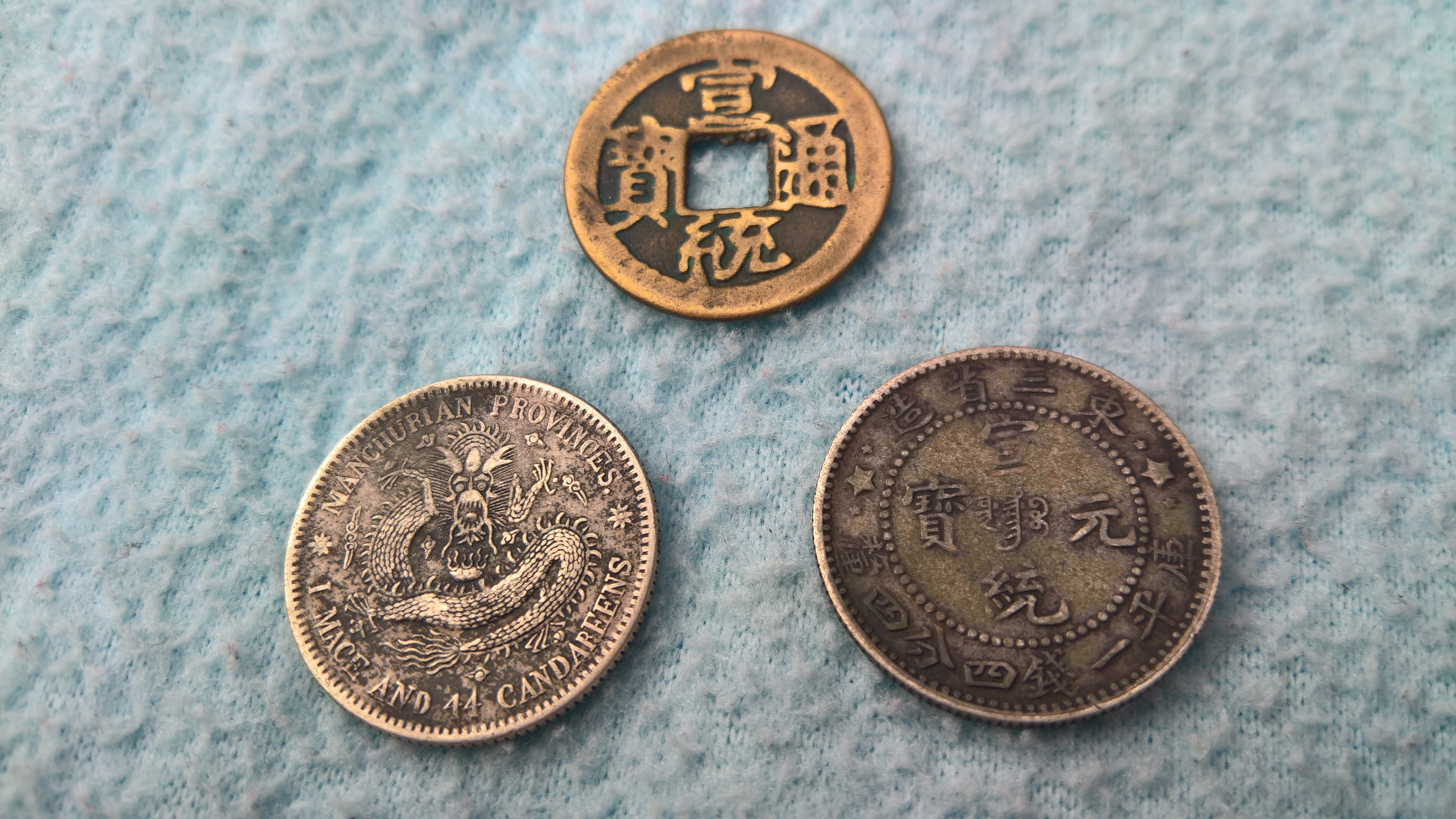
Brass and silver coins issued under the Xuantong Emperor.

Under the Xuantong Emperor both traditional copper cash coins, and modern machine-struck coins continued to be minted simultaneously, though only the Ministry of Revenue in Beijing and a few provincial mints continued to cast traditional cash coins as most mints had started to exclusively produce machined coins, and Kucha was the only mint still operating in Xinjiang casting "red cash" under the Xuantong Emperor. Under the Xuantong Emperor, two of Beijing's central-government operated mints would close. In 1910 new machine-made coins were issued.

New denominations introduced in 1910 include:

| Denomination (in Traditional Chinese) | Denomination (in English) | Obverse image | Reverse image |
|---|---|---|---|
| 一厘 | 1 lí | | |
| 五厘 | 5 lí | | |
| 一分 | 1 fēn | | |
| 二分 | 2 fēn | | |
| 壹圓 | 1 yuán | | |

These denominations were not produced in large numbers as the Qing dynasty would be overthrown by the Xinhai Revolution only a year later. By the end of the Qing dynasty the government's attempts at modernising the monetary system had failed and machined coins circulated alongside traditional coinages, this situation would continue under the Republic of China.

== Copper coinage ==
During the Qing dynasty period, the Chinese monetary system was a bimetallic system where both copper-alloy cash coins and silver circulated simultaneously. The copper-alloy currency during most of the Qing dynasty period consisted solely of cash coins with a denomination of 1 wén, which could be strung together into strings of 1,000 cash coins for larger payments. While strings officially consisted of 1,000 cash coins, normally it would contain only around 980 copper-alloy cash coins.

A standard piece of copper-alloy cash coin in the 18th century weighted 0.12 tael, containing between 50%–70% of pure copper, and other metals in its alloy such as zinc and lead.

The copper coinage of the Qing dynasty was officially set at an exchange rate of 1000 wén (or cash coins) for one tael of silver, however actual market rate often changed from low as 700 wén for 1 tael of silver to as high as 1200 wén for a single tael of silver during the 19th century. The actual exchange rates were dependent on a variety of factors such as the quantity of the coinage on the market and quality of individual coins. Most government cast coinage entered the market through soldiers.

Because all copper-alloy cash coins of the Qing dynasty had both uniform shapes and weights, the denomination of the cash coins were not written down anywhere on the coins themselves, this was because for most of their history, a cash coin was always valued at 1 wén and payments were processed by counting the number of cash coins.

The government of the Qing dynasty monopolised the production of copper-alloy cash coins, which constituted less than 20% of the total money circulating in China at the time, as well as the mining of copper, while the government allowed for the market to determine the price of silver.

Because casting is a very simple process many private (illegal) mints started producing fake cash coins known as Sīzhùqián (私鑄錢) because government mints often could not meet the market's demand for money, as there barely was a difference in quality between "real" or Zhìqián (制錢) and "fake" coins, the sizhuqian were just as widely accepted by the general population as means of payment. Though barter had remained common during most of the Qing era, by the mid 19th century the Chinese market had evolved to be highly monetised. Due to the inflation caused by various military crises under the Xianfeng Emperor new larger denomination cash coins were issued, cash coins of 4 wén and higher being referred to as Dàqián (大錢).

The cash coins produced by the two imperial mints located in Beijing and the provincial and regional mints usually fulfilled different functions. The local mints mostly produced cash coins for the payment of the salaries of the Bannermen and the wages of workers on government construction projects. The imperial mints (known as the Baoyuan Mint and Baoquan Mint) situated in the capital city of Beijing were the two most important ones in operation during the Qing dynasty period: their output of copper-alloy cash coins sustained the demands of the market, not only in Beijing itself, but also in the part of northern China situated near the capital city.

The minting of copper-alloy cash coinage was decentralised due to the very high transaction cost of moving large amounts of metallic coins (and especially heavy copper-alloy cash coins that tended to have small values). Sometimes the production of copper coinage at provincial state mints was suspended but minting at the imperial mints in Beijing was always ensured by the Qing government.

By the late Qing dynasty it had become apparent that carrying strings of cash coins was inconvenient compared to modern currencies. In 1900, 8 shillings converted into 32.6587 kilograms of copper cash coins and it was noted that if one of the straw strings holding the coins would break that it would cost more picking those coins up in time than the value retrieved from those coins. This was one of the many different factors leading Chinese people to more readily accept the modernisation of the currency.

When comparing the contemporary Chinese monetary system of the Qing dynasty period with that of medieval Europe it shows that in both cases the chronic shortage of low-denomination coinages seems to be more an aspect of economic theory than actual history, as the gap that emerges between the legal tender (or nominal) value and the intrinsic metallic value will always be followed either by counterfeiting or by melting the currency down.

=== Purchasing power of coins ===
At the time Wu Jingzi's the Scholars was written in the 18th century 3 wén could buy a steamed bun, 4 wén could buy school food, 16 wén was enough for one bowl of noodles, and the annual tuition fee for school could be covered by 2,400 wén, but due to inflation the purchasing power of cash coins would decline in the next century.

| Period | Amount of rice for 1000 wén (or 1 string of cash coins) |
|---|---|
| 1651–1660 | 99.6 kg |
| 1681–1690 | 136 kg |
| 1721–1730 | 116 kg |
| 1781–1790 | 57.3 kg |
| 1811–1820 | 25.2 kg |
| 1841–1850 | 21.6 kg |

=== Effects of the global devaluation of silver ===
Traditionally, scholars of the monetary history of the Qing dynasty, and the Far East as a whole, have often debated whether or not the inflow or outflow of silver leads to an economic boom or an economic depression.

Proponents of the classic bimetallic system would suggest that having two metals would dampen the shocks that result from a shortage of either one of the metals used in the economy for doing transactions with and would therefore stabilise the currency system. Besides the movement and flow of physical silver, the price of silver also had an effect on trade and the general economy. Theoretically, "cheap silver" (a term used to denote the relatively low price of silver in international market) can be taken in a bimetallic system or a silver standard system as a sudden and exogenous currency devaluation, and this would then indicate favourable terms of trade for silver standard countries as the devaluation of silver would encourage exports as the price of goods have been reduced, thus making it more favourable for foreign merchants to purchase these goods. The economy and monetary situation of the Qing dynasty from the 1870s onwards seem to contradict this hypothesis. During the 1870s many countries around the world replaced the silver standard with the gold standard, causing old silver coinages to be demonetised lowering the price of silver on a global scale. The demonetisation of silver in many countries not only led to a drop in the price of silver, but also increased the volatility of its price, the unstable exchange also offset some of the benefit from silver depreciation. The new silver deposits discovered in the Rocky Mountains in the United States and Canada also contributed to the price drop. Countries like Japan, Nguyễn Vietnam, and British India all benefited from this price reduction, but Qing China did not enjoy the benefits as much as other countries. In fact the Qing dynasty, while enjoying greater exports, began to import more during this period leading to a trade deficit. In Chongqing alone the value of foreign merchandise had fallen off by over Hk.Tls 1,250,000 in just a sort period of time because of the global devaluing of silver.

During this period the general price of Chinese exports would increase because of the volatile silver price compared to both gold and copper, these increased prices further offset the depreciation benefit of the cheaper silver price. During this period most Chinese exports were in fact rural products whose prices were quoted in copper-alloy cash coins; the prices of these goods were then translated into silver at the point where they would be exported to other countries. A depreciation of the silver meant that the cheaper exchange rate between silver and copper-alloy cash coins would make these exports more expensive, despite the rural prices remaining relatively stable. The sudden and permanent decrease of the global price of silver had greatly destabilised the price relationship between copper and silver in China which was the basis for its bimetallic system, and therefore this depreciation challenged the entire monetary system of the Qing dynasty and would push it to be drastically changed.

During this period the rural Chinese hinterland began to develop more cash crops for export as more treaty ports were forced to open, and while formerly it were the coastal regions that had a more export-oriented economy, the Chinese hinterland started to focus more on export. Traditionally, Chinese farmers sold their produce to middlemen who would then sell the products in treaty ports, but the "cheap silver" had made it more expensive for the middlemen to purchase these goods and the farmers would be less likely to accept silver for their products the further away from commercial cities or from the well-developed financial facilities they were. The higher exchange rate between silver and copper-alloy cash coins favouring the latter caused deflation and made the business of the middlemen less profitable.

The government also minted less copper-alloy cash coins during this period because of the high cost of minting them, which further contributed to the shortage of copper-alloy cash coins in the Chinese economy. While the trade impact of the global "cheap silver" was largely confined to the coastal areas, the monetary impact of "cheap silver" was felt nationwide. A drop in the price of silver had further aggravated the shortage of copper-alloy cash coinage: the imperial mints in Beijing then consequently suspended the production of copper-alloy cash coinage due to the increased cost of production; and the existing cash as "undervalued money" (Gresham's law) were then melted down for their intrinsic value. Additionally, the provision of cash coinage was a centralised decision which was also implemented by regional governments throughout China. Because of these factors the Chinese were not able to seize the opportunity to increase their exports due to the "cheap silver" as Japan, India, and Vietnam had.

In fact, rather than being an opportunity for China, "cheap silver" presented itself as a challenge for China, especially for the Chinese bimetallic monetary system. Despite a large silver inflow to treaty ports and urban centres throughout China, the vast Chinese rural population was now suffering from a shortage of copper-alloy cash coins. Only when the Chinese copper coinage was adequately depreciated could the trade benefits presented by "cheap silver" be realised and benefit the economy of the Qing dynasty. This could only be realised by once again devaluing the copper coinage.

=== Scarcity of copper-alloy cash coins ===
Due to the prevalence of "cheap silver" (an enormous decrease of the global price of silver) the copper-alloy cash coin-based economy of China suffered deflation which discouraged the export of Chinese products. International trade was further discouraged because of the scarcity of copper-alloy cash coins in rural China during the late 19th century. This scarcity not only discouraged international trade, but also long-distance exchanges within China because of the deflationary pressure. Furthermore, this scarcity of small denomination copper-alloy cash coins in China was having a negative impact on daily transactions, especially in the inland rural areas where absolutely no business was done in silver and the local people had an inelastic demand for these coins. The rural Chinese workers tended to only receive their salaries in copper-alloy cash coins and would pay their taxes in silver using the official government set exchange rates between the two metal currencies. When the scarcity started causing deflation the rural workers would receive lower salaries, but the government kept maintaining a relatively high exchange rate between the two currencies.

According to reports published by provincial governors in the year 1896, the official exchange rate between copper-alloy cash coins and silver was 2200 wén for only 1 tael of silver; while at the time a tael of silver traded on the private market for 1600 wén to 1700 wén.

"A real difficulty the government has to face is the scarcity of copper cash – a difficulty which is likely to increase, as the intrinsic value of the cash as metal is actually greater than that of the silver for which they at present exchange. The copper money purchasable for a tael of silver costs the Government for metal (copper and zinc) not less than Tls. 1,354, which does not include the cost of minting. This condition has not only restricted coinage but has resulted in a serious disappearance of the coins, due to melting down for the sake of the copper. The number of cash exchanged for a tael in Shanghai has fallen since 1892 from 1,400 to 1,170, and a further fall is to be feared." (Note: Possibly because of the contemporary spelling habit, the figures that were quoted in this original text by the Imperial Customs Service such as 1,354, 1,400, and 1,170 are written in modern English as 1.354, 1.400, and 1.170 respectably.)

– Imperial Customs Service (1898).

This imbalance further resulted in permanent changes in the prices of goods and services relative to the other metal. The money stock was also affected as the amount of silver coinages in circulation kept increasing, while the stock of copper-alloy cash coins was surely decreasing, leading to even greater deflation in copper-based markets.

As a result, the mints operated by the government of the Qing dynasty saw less motivation to produce more copper-alloy cash coins as they were now more expensive to make, as it now cost more silver to import sufficient amounts of copper for their production.

The imperial government would continue to try to maintain the official exchange rate between copper-alloy cash coins and silver, but this only made copper-alloy cash coins into an "undervalued currency" and further discouraged it from circulating as people would hoard the coins driving them out of the market, further increasing their relative scarcity to silver (as is described by Gresham's law). This severely negatively affected the economy of rural areas where copper-alloy cash coins circulated as the principal (if not only) currency and was used in high frequency for the daily transactions of most (if not all) people in these regions.

It has always been a challenge for the imperial Chinese government to debase the copper coinage to make its production more adorable. This was because debased coinages will be discounted on the market and always invite widespread counterfeiting. The solution to this problem was by introducing new machine-struck coinages that were produced by steam powered machines, this would make it more difficult for counterfeiters to produce fake coinages as the initial costs to purchase the machines needed for counterfeiting were very high and discouraged many would-be counterfeiters. The new technology allowed the Qing government to cast high-quality, standardised coins with machined edges. Therefore the new technology provided a for the government of the Qing dynasty a way to mint sufficient token coins at an affordable cost without inviting forgers to debase the new coinages even further.

While the new technology allowed the Qing government to mint sufficient amounts of copper-alloy coins at an affordable cost, the new technology was not implemented throughout China at the same time as some provinces would adopt the technology later. Initially the new machine-struck coinages were well received where they were introduced, which helped other provincial mints adopt the new technology faster.

=== Counterfeit machine-struck coins ===
Not long after these new copper coins were introduced, black market counterfeit versions of the 10 wén appeared, illegal mints opened all over China and started producing more coins than the Qing government's set quotas allowed there to be circulating on the market. Both Chinese and foreigners soon started producing struck cash coins of inferior quality often with traces of the Korean 5 fun coins they were overstruck on, or with characters and symbols not found on official government issued coins. These coins were often minted by Korean businessmen and former Japanese Samurai looking to make a profit on exchanging the low value copper coins into silver dollars as a single silver dollar had the purchasing power of 1000 Korean fun. The majority of the counterfeit coins bear the inscription that they were minted in either Zhejiang or Shandong, but they circulated all over the coastal regions of China.

== Cash coins made from other metals ==
=== Iron cash coins ===
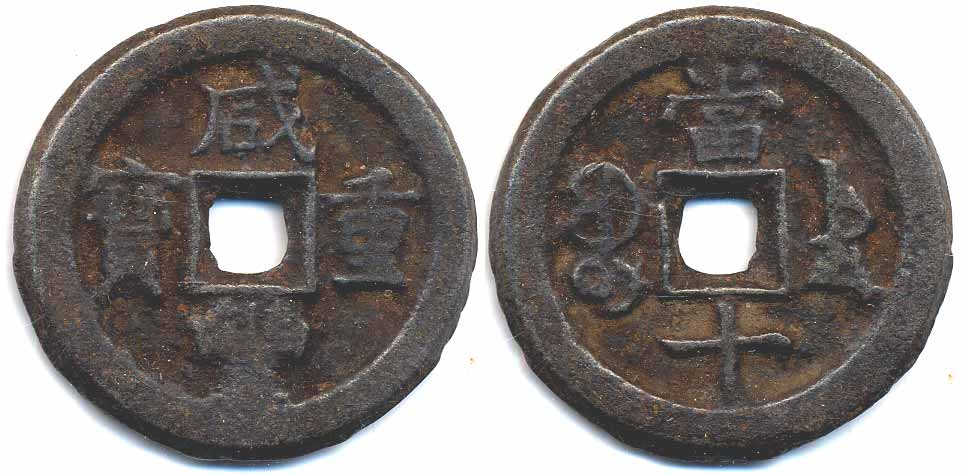
An iron Xianfeng Zhongbao (咸豐重寶) cash coin of 10 wén.

During the second month of the year 1854 the government of the Qing dynasty supplemented the already debased coinage system with iron cash coins. The intrinsic value of iron cash coins was substantially lower than that of even the copper-alloy Zhiqian and Daqian. The aim the government had with the introduction of iron cash coins was to provide small change for a market that highly demanded it, as the Chinese market was already flooded with large denomination cash coinage and the Zhiqian 1 wén cash coins) by this point had become a rarity.

The denominations of the newly introduced iron cash coins included 1 wén, 5 wén, and 10 wén. Disregarding manufacturing costs, the intrinsic value of the 1 wén iron cash coin represented a debasement of 70% compared to the copper-alloy 1 wén Zhiqian. The market price of iron in 1854 was 40 wén (in Zhiqian) per catty. A catty of iron could be cast into 133 1 wén iron cash coins, or 66 5 wén iron cash coins (which would have a total nominal value of 330 wén), or 53 10 wén iron cash coins (which would have a total nominal value of 530 wén). Iron cash coins were easily produced with iron scrap, which on the market cost 15 wén per catty in 1854.

While initially iron cash coins were mainly minted by the Ministry of Revenue mint and Ministry of Public Works mint in Beijing, afterwards the government of the Qing dynasty established a specific iron cash coins mint, known as the iron cash office (鐵錢局). The iron cash office also stored the iron cash coins. While the actual production numbers of iron cash coins remains unclear because of the limited entries about them in the records maintained by the Qing treasury, Peng Xinwei estimated, based on information he had gathered from Qing government memorials, that there had been an average annual production of 1,808,160 strings of iron cash coins between the year 1854 and 1855 and an annual production of 1,360,920 strings of iron cash coins during the years 1856 until 1859.

In January of the year 1855 the province of Zhili started casting iron cash coins, a trial casting for a single year was to deliver 120,000 strings of standard cash coins to be brought to Beijing. This work was then carried out by one of the Chinese branch mints with 10 furnaces that was located just outside of the western suburbs of Baoding by the Lingyu Temple (靈雲宮). In May of the year 1857, the four existing copper furnaces of the main Zhili provincial mint in Baoding were altered to be iron cash coin furnaces and a new iron cash coin furnace added, while at the same time 10 new furnaces for the production of iron cash coins was added to the Zhili branch mint. The Zhili provincial mint had ceased the production of 10 wén iron cash coins in June 1857.

Iron cash coin mints were also planned to be opened in the cities of Tianjin, Zhengding, and Daming for the production of 1 wén iron cash coins, but only Zhengding had established a mint for iron cash coins which had 10 furnaces in operation. In July of the year 1859 there were a total of 35 furnaces for the production of iron cash coins in the cities of Baoding and Zhengding and at that time around 1,000,000 strings of iron cash coins had been cast at both mints. Because the Chinese people were not using iron cash coins it was reported that 30 furnaces in Zhengding (which presumably also includes the furnaces of the Zhili provincial branch mint) were to be closed. In November 1859, the remaining 5 iron cash coin furnaces situated in Baoding were also closed.

The function of iron cash coins was similar to that of Daqian, as it was primarily used as a way to continue paying the salaries of bannermen and other government workers. According to Qing government memorials, large amounts of iron cash coins were used as a means to pay salaries between the years 1856 and 1857 due to a noted justification that "the Chinese public was craving for small change". By the year 1856 the iron 10 wén cash coins were so much depreciated that they were dropped out of general circulation. From this point onwards only iron 1 wén cash coins would remain in general circulation, however, it was common for shops to deny them as a form of payment and there was extensive counterfeiting of iron cash coins, which further lowered the public's trust in them.

Only a single entry in the Qing government archive mentions them from this point, as it is stated that in the year 1856 the government of the Qing dynasty had 431,515.849 strings of iron cash coins deposited in the imperial treasury vault. This entry may be seen as supplementary evidence to suggest that copper-alloy cash coinage had almost completely disappeared in or before this year. Iron cash coins would soon become valueless and the coinage was ultimately suspended in the year 1859.

=== Lead cash coins ===
It was reported in the records of the Qing dynasty that lead cash coins were minted for a brief period in the year 1854, although it seems that these lead cash coins were never actually introduced into the Chinese market and therefore did not circulate.

=== Zinc cash coins ===
In July 1854 a superintendent of the Ministry of Revenue mint reported that different metals like gold, silver, copper, iron, and zinc are alike when used and believed that if copper could be substituted for iron, iron could be substituted for zinc. The Ministry of Revenue mint initiated trial castings of zinc cash coins, but caused the mint staff to be anxious over the fact that zinc cash coinage is very brittle and easy to break. It was then decided to make cash coins with an alloy of 80% (brittle) zinc and 20% (soft) lead, as these zinc-alloy cash coins would then be better to circulate and would be more acceptable for the people. It was then proposed to replace the monthly production of 2 mǎo (卯) of Zhiqian with the zinc-alloy cash coins because the Ministry of Revenue mint had zinc in store, which would immediately allow the mint to save 100,000 catty of copper.

== Silver coinage ==
Originally imperial China was on a monometallic standard of using only bronze cash coins during most of its history, but the large influx, because of international trade, of silver during the Ming dynasty period created a bimetallic system in China. From the 3rd century B.C. copper had been the paramount currency of most of China but during the 16th and 17th centuries A.D. this had changed.

Silver had long been the currency for China's overseas trade until the mid-1930s. China during most of the Qing dynasty period was not a silver producing country and its silver supply relied on imports from abroad. It was only during the 1890s that provincial Chinese mints started producing native silver coinages.

=== Status of silver during the Qing dynasty ===
During most of the Qing dynasty period silver circulated in China in two forms, that of silver sycees and foreign silver dollars (primarily Spanish dollars from Spanish Philippines). Silver was used more in interregional trade and was more often used to pay for large transactions, furthermore it was not counted by denomination but by weight. The primary weight unit of silver was the tael. Contrary to copper, silver was not monopolised by the government but the price of silver instead was determined by the market.

The tael was used both as a unit of account as well as a unit of weight, the concept is similar to "pound" and "pound sterling". There were various standards for defining the weight of a tael, this was because the weighing scales varied a lot between the different regions of China and Qing government bodies. The weight unit "tael" (兩) usually varied between 33.99 and 37.50 grams, but when used as a unit of account the "silver tael" (銀兩) had many different definitions that were based in terms of purity and fineness of the silver being weighed. For example, the Treasury tael (Kuping liang or Kuping tael) is the standard for taxation, the Maritime Customs tael (Haiguan liang or Haikwan tael) is the standard used in the Maritime Customs Service, the market tael (Shiping liang) is the standard used in the market in Beijing.

Contrary to how the supply and demand of copper was regulated through government channels, supply and demand of silver was determined solely by the market. The domestic silver production in China was generally low and the silver in China came mostly from Edo Japan and later from the Americas, mainly through international trade with foreign merchants.

This situation of silver in Qing China is similar to that of medieval England. The Kingdom of England did not produce significant amounts of silver by itself and therefore its coinage was closely associated with its overseas and international trade. The monarchs, both in imperial China and in the Kingdom of England, did not own the native silver supply. But unlike the English Crown, which had set up royal mints in England to strike the silver bullion into coins with a nominal (or face) value, the Chinese Emperor allowed only silver bullion itself to circulate in various forms throughout his empire. The government of the Qing dynasty provided only the standard unit (known as the Kuping tael) that a silver ingot should be melted into, which itself evolved into one of the many different "taels" that was used for silver bullion to be traded.

Because the purchasing power of silver bullion was so much higher than that of copper-alloy cash coins, silver was used primarily for larger transactions and long-distance trade as well as international trade, while copper-alloy cash coinage was therefore not taken as subsidiary money: it was the currency for daily and smaller transactions and copper was the only currency in rural China during the Qing dynasty period. Silver also enjoyed a special status as it was also the major form of currency that was used for the payment taxes and government expenditures.

Because of this, the government of the Qing dynasty had attempted to establish a fixed rate for the exchange of copper-alloy cash coins and silver bullion. During the majority of the Qing dynasty period, the official ratio between silver (in taels) and copper-alloy cash coins (in wén) was maintained at 1:1,000. The ratio was later revised to 1:2,000 during the 1840s, due to the rising price of silver.

This theoretical official exchange rate was in practice not enforced by any government institution as because the imperial government did not coin any silver, it had no control over how silver circulated on the market. As the silver flow was primarily based on foreign trade and silver both entered and left China in large numbers, the market exchange rate between silver and copper changed drastically over time and tended to fluctuate, furthermore this exchange rate also varied from region to region. Services specialising in money exchanges, known as money-changers, developed in this currency system, and the exchange normally took place in commercial centres and trade ports where different trades were frequently carried out.

The currency system in China during the Qing dynasty is sometimes called a "parallel bimetallic system", to distinguish it from the more conventional model of a bimetallic system. The term "parallel bimetallic system" is given to this system because it functioned more like a form of coexistence of "two currency systems, each using a different metal" than an actual bimetallic system. Also unlike real bimetallism in other countries, the actual exchange ratio between the two different metal currencies was not actually fixed; the exchange ratio tended to vary depending on time and place.

=== Imperial government produced silver coinages ===
Government produced silver coins during the Qianlong era

During the reign of the Qianlong Emperor commemorative silver coins with the portrait of the Tibetan Panchen Lama are known to have been produced.

Government produced silver coins during the Daoguang era

During the reign of the Daoguang Emperor several attempts were made in China for the native production of government backed silver coinage, the first of such attempts were tried in the year 1821. Machine-struck Chinese silver coins were known to have been first produced in the year 1822, by the modern Jilin Arsenal Mint (吉林機器局). These early milled silver coins were known as the Changpingliang (廠平兩, literally "factory tael") and only had the denomination of one tael. These silver Changpingliang were not manufactured in any high numbers and are consequently very rare today.

Other models of modern silver coinages, which are known as ban (板), that were known to have been produced in the cities of Guangzhou, Fuzhou, Hangzhou, Suzhou, Wuxi, and Jiangxi. The models of milled silver coins produced in Wuxi are known as xiban (錫板) and the ones produced in Jiangxi are known as tuban (土板). There were also the models known as Wuzhuang (吳莊) and Xingzhuang (行莊).

Another early attempt at creating a native government-produced silver Chinese coinage was made by Lin Zexu, he created a system of silver coinages known as the Yinbing (銀餅, literally "Silver cakes") which had a standard weight of 0.72 tael, but the Yinbing was eventually rejected by the Jiangsu market.

The earliest known surviving modern silver coins of the Qing dynasty period were manufactured in the city of Zhangtai, Fujian. There are two types of these modern silver Zhangtai coins, one featured an image, this image either consisted of Shouxing, the God of longevity, a pair of crossed Ruyi scepters, or a pair of crossed writing brushes, which are known as bibao (筆寶).

The other known type of Zhangtai silver coins featured both ornaments and inscriptions, the first type of these inscribed silver coins featured the inscriptions Daoguang Nian Zhu (道光年鑄) and Zuwen Yinbing (足紋銀餅), and the indication of the value of the coin, namely the inscription Kuping Qi-Er (庫平柒弍, "0.72 Kuping tael"). The reverse side of these coins featured a tripod with a Manchu language inscription indicating the mint where it was produced. The coins without images were inscribed with the Chinese characters for "Junxiang" (軍餉), this inscription being a rather clear indication of the method that the government of the Qing dynasty used to throw money on the Chinese local markets. The ornaments on the second type of silver coins were mostly imitations of the decorations that are depicted on the various foreign coins that circulated in the region at the time, but sometimes these ornaments just merged Chinese characters, like jinshen (謹慎, "reverentially").

These silver coins were brought into general circulation through military salaries (Junxiang), and unlike the earlier attempts were accepted by the local Jiangsu market. The date when these modern silver coins of southeast China were exactly produced remains unclear today, but they were certainly not produced before the 19th century.

Government produced silver coins during the Xianfeng era

During the Xianfeng period the government did not issue its own silver coins, but it did issue a series of banknotes that were nominally worth silver in weight (taels).

Government produced silver coins during the Guangxu era

Prior to 1 tael being standardised at 50 g. by the government of the People's Republic of China in 1959, the weight "tael" differed substantially from province to province, the Qing government maintained that 1 tael equals 37.5 g. and this measurement was referred to as the Kuping tael (庫平两), and by official Qing government standards 1 Kuping tael = 10 Mace = 100 Candareens. Under the Guangxu Emperor several Kuping tael coins were struck in Tianjin from 1903 until 1907, and mostly served as salary for the soldiers. Despite the central government's attempts at unifying the standards provincial coinage remained the de facto standard across China.

Since the 1870s, silver was used both as an official form of currency in Qing China and a commodity in the international market, for this reason the international price of silver was considered to be indicative of the international exchange rate of the Chinese currency. When the global price of silver experienced a lot of fluctuation the unstable exchange rate of the Chinese currency made pricing on the Chinese market much less predictable and therefore the volatility in the pricing of silver at the time had discouraged trade.

In the year 1903 the imperial Chinese government had issued a decree that was intended to standardise the Chinese silver coins in circulation, but in actuality the government decree was never really implemented. The highest standard of indigenous Chinese coinages produced under Qing rule was probably achieved by the gold, silver, and copper coins produced in the city of Tianjin between the years 1906 and 1907.

Government produced silver coins during the Xuantong era

Only as late as 1910 was it decided by the Qing government to have a unified national currency that would be produced in Wuchang and in Nanjing. The government of the Qing dynasty had issued a number of new regulations that would create a uniform national silver currency system.

Under the Xuantong Emperor another attempt at standardising the Qing dynasty's silver coinage was made in 1911 (Xuantong 3) a large amount of "dragon dollars" bearing the inscription "壹圓" (yīyuán) were minted, these were the only Qing dynasty coins with that inscription and also featured the English legend "One Dollar". These coins were all cast at the Central Tianjin Mint.

The coin was called yuán (圓 or 元, in this context meaning "dollar") and they had a standard weight of 0.72 tael. It was inscribed with the words Great Qing Silver Coin (大清銀幣) and was introduced into the Chinese market in October of the year 1910.

After the fall of the Qing dynasty sycees were demonetised in 1933 and Qing dynasty silver coins in 1935 as they were replaced with paper money.

=== Provincial and private silver coinages ===
==== 1910 Yunnan "spring dollars" ====
In the year 1910 the provincial government of Yunnan issued a Chinese dragon dollar coin that is commonly known as the "Yunnan Spring dollar", the coin was issued after the government of the Qing dynasty had enacted the "Currency Regulations" (traditional Chinese: 幣制則例; simplified Chinese: 币制则例; pinyin: bì zhì zé lì) on 15 April 1910. The Yunnanese government had quickly taken the coin dies that they had been using to make the silver coins they issued in 1909 and would then engrave these new coins with an additional inscription at the top stating "Made in Yunnan Province in the spring of the year Gengxu (1910)" (traditional Chinese: 庚戌春季雲南造; simplified Chinese: 庚戌春季云南造; pinyin: gēng xū chūn jì yún nán zào). This the only coin in the numismatic history of China that features a season of the year as part of the date. This was done because according to the traditional Chinese calendar that was in use at the time, the "spring" was a time that referred to the first 3 months of the year, January, February, and March. The centre of the obverse of the Yunnan Spring dollar contains the inscription "Xuantong Yuanbao" (宣統元寶), while on the bottom it contains the denomination of the coin as "Kuping Qi Qian Er Fen" (traditional Chinese: 庫平七錢二分; simplified Chinese: 库平七钱二分; pinyin: kù píng qī qián èr fēn, "Treasury Standard 7 Mace and 2 Candareens"). The reverse side of the coin features prominent dragon. The Yunnan mint deliberately wrote down that the coin was issued in "the spring of 1910", because the new regulations set by the imperial government would not take effect until April 1910. However, the imperial Chinese government soon discovered the scheme at the Yunnan mint and quickly ordered that all these of these new "spring dollar" coins were to be withdrawn and later melted down. In 1920 during the early Republican era it was discovered that an extremely small number of these coins had escaped being destroyed and these surviving specimens that are now known are commonly referred to as the "Yunnan Spring dollars" by Chinese numismatists and coin collectors. Only two genuine specimens are known to exist making it among the very rarest of China's coins.

- In April of the year 2002 the first genuine "Yunnan Spring dollar" to appear at public auction was sold in Beijing, at the Hua Chen auction.
- In 2007 the same "Yunnan Spring dollar" as above was re-sold in a Cheng Xuan sale in Beijing where the coin was sold for ¥3,192,000 ($468,000).
- In August of the year 2010 the same "Yunnan Spring dollar" as above was sold at a Hong Kong auction by Michael Chou, of Champion Hong Kong Auction for $1,035,000.

==== Private production of silver coinage ====
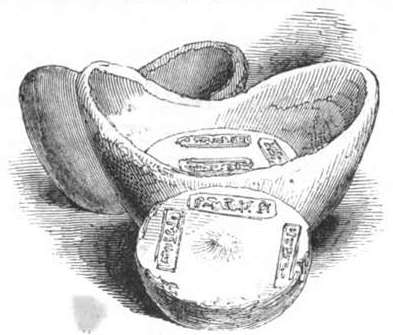
An illustration of various weights of privately produced silver sycees.

Despite silver making up the other half of the bimetallic system of the Qing dynasty's coinage it was not officially produced by the government until the later period of the dynasty where the silver coins would be based on the foreign coins that already circulated in China. Government ledgers used it as a unit of account, in particular the Kuping Tael (庫平兩) was used for this. For most of its history both the production and the measurements of silver was in the hands of the private market which handled the exclusive production of silver currency, the greatest amount of silver ingots in China was produced by private silversmiths (銀樓) in professional furnaces (銀爐), only a very small amount of silver ingots was issued by government-owned banks during the late 19th century. While assayers and moneychangers had control over its exchange rates, for this reason no unified system of silver currency in place in China but a series of different types of silver ingots that were used in various markets throughout the country. The most common form of silver ingots (元寶 or 寶銀) in China were the "horse-hoof ingots" (馬蹄銀) and could weigh as much as fifty taels, there were also "middle-size ingots" (中錠) which usually weigh around 10 taels, "small-size ingots" (小錠) (Note: They were also known as "小錁" (xiǎokè) and "錁子" (kèzi).) that weighed between one and five taels, and "silver crumbs" (碎銀 or 銀子). (Note: Note that in the early stages of the existence of Chinese silver crumbs the term Yinzi (銀子) referred to their standard size.) All freshly cast ingots were sent to official assayers (公估局) where their weight and fineness were marked with a brush. However, these determinations were only valid on the local market and nowhere else do silver ingots were constantly reassessed which was the daily business of Chinese money changers. In fact, silver ingots were weighed in each single transaction.

Silver ingots were traded at different rates that were dependent on the purity of their silver content, the average ones were known as Wenyin (紋銀) or Zubao (足寶) which had (theoretical) purity of .935374, meanwhile specimens that were of higher quality and content were referred to by true surplus that was to be advanced on changing. Exempli gratia a silver ingot known as an "Er-Si Bao" (二四寶) with a weight of fifty taels was valued at 52.4 taels. Likewise other silver standards in China were all geared to the Wenyin such as the Shanghai tael that used in the foreign concession of the city, for instance, was called the Jiuba Guiyuan (九八規元) because it had 98 per cent of the purity of the Shanghai standard tael (規元). The standard tael of Tianjin was called the Xinghua (行化) and that of Hankou was known as the Yangli (洋例).

During the Xianfeng period a series of "silver cakes" (銀餅) was issued in 1856 by three private banks in the city of Shanghai, namely the Wang Yong Sheng (王永盛), Jing Zheng Ji (經正記), and Yu Sen Sheng (郁森盛). Their cakes were manufactured by steel matrices and they tended to have a weight of 1 tael and 0.5 tael.

=== Weights and standards ===
The most commonly used English term to describe Chinese silver ingots is "sycee" (細絲), which comes from a Cantonese term meaning "fine weight" where the "weight" (絲, sī) represents 0.00001 tael. However a large number of regional terms and names for these silver ingots existed throughout China, these names include:

| Name | Traditional Chinese | Simplified Chinese | Region | Image of a regionally produced sycee |
|---|---|---|---|---|
| Yuansi | 元絲 | 元丝 | Southern Jiangsu and Zhejiang. | |
| Yanche | 鹽撤 | 盐撤 | Jiangxi, Hubei, and Hunan. | |
| Xicao Shuisi | 西鏪水絲 | 西鏪水丝 | Shandong. | |
| Tucao | 土鏪 | 土鏪 | Sichuan. | |
| Liucao | 柳鏪 | 柳鏪 | Sichuan. | |
| Huixiang | 茴香 | 茴香 | Sichuan. | |
| Yuancao | 元鏪 | 元鏪 | Shaanxi and Gansu. | |
| Beiliu | 北流 | 北流 | Guangxi. | |
| Shicao | 石鏪 | 石鏪 | Yunnan. | |
| Chahua | 茶花 | 茶花 | Yunnan. | |

Among the aforementioned regional names other designations for sycees were Qingsi (青絲), Baisi (白絲), Danqing (單傾), Shuangqing (雙傾), Fangcao (方鏪), and Changcao (長鏪) among many others.

Aside from the large number of names for sycees that existed in China there was also a wealth of different weight standards for taels that existed that were different from market to market. One of the larger variants of the tael was the Kuping Tael (庫平兩) which was used by the Chinese Ministry of Revenue for both weight measurements as well as a unit of account used during tax collections. In 1858 a new trade tax was introduced which used the Sea Customs tael (海關兩) as a unit of account, meanwhile in Guangdong the Canton Tael (廣平兩) was used when trading with foreign merchants. Another unit of account that was used was the Grain Tribute Tael (漕平兩) which was used for measuring and accounting the tribute the imperial Chinese government received in grain.

== Mint marks ==
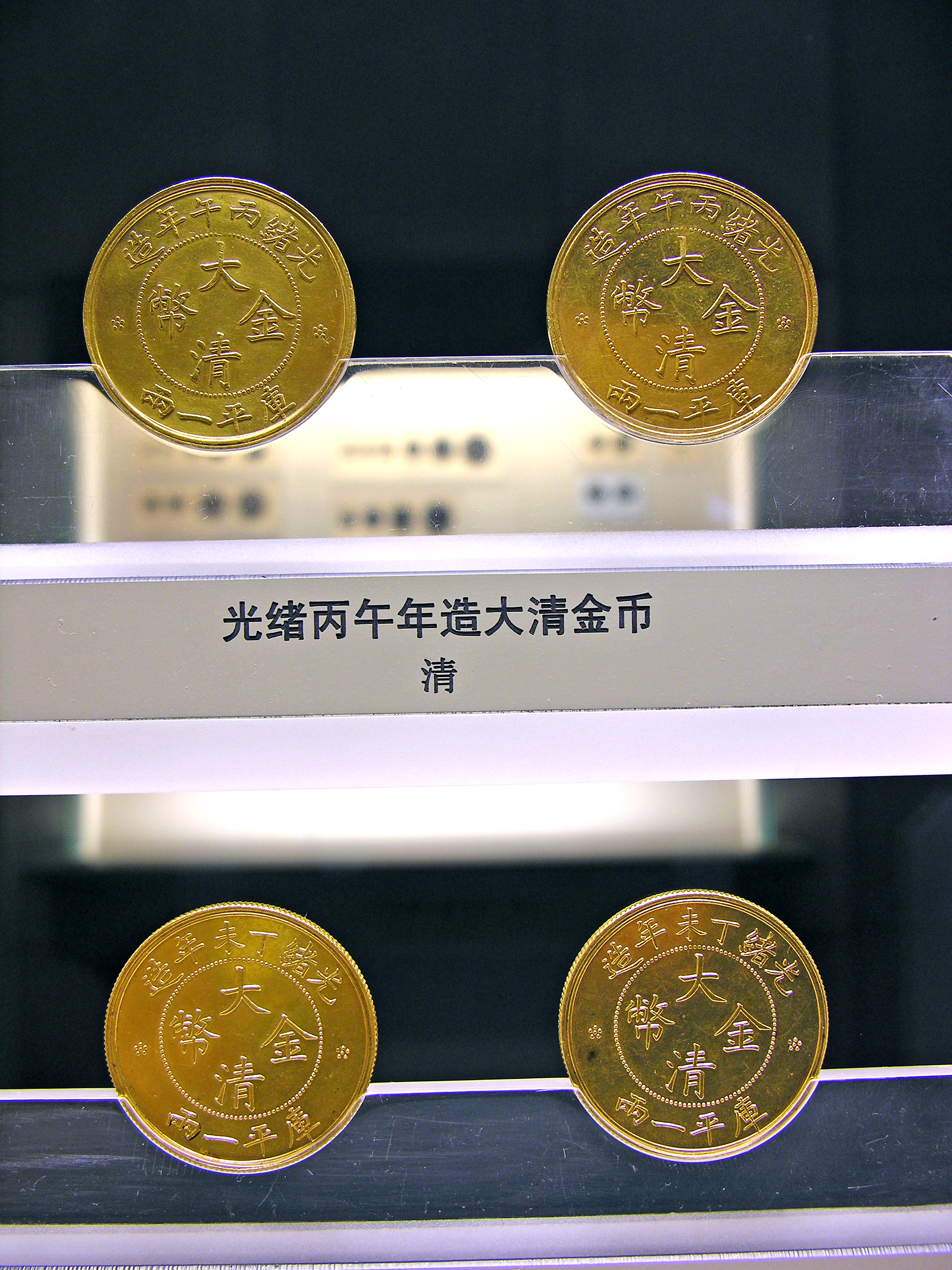
Golden 1 tael Great Qing Gold Coin (大清金幣) coins produced under the reign of the Guangxu Emperor.

In total there had been more than 50 local mints established that each bore their own unique mint marks, however several of these mints operated only for a brief time before discontinuing their casting of cash coins, mint marks on Qing dynasty coinage can be categorised into 7 main categories based on the scripts on the reverse sides of the coins: 1) only have Manchu script mint marks; 2) Only have mint marks in Chinese script with the weight of the coin in lí; 3) have both Manchu, and Chinese script mint marks; 4) only have a single Chinese character indicating the mint on the top of the reverse side; 5) Only contain the character "一" (1) on the reserve 6) have both Manchu, and Chinese scripts together on the right and left sides of the coin, plus the denomination of the denomination on the top and bottom, and 7) have Chinese, Manchu, and Arabic script together on the reverse side of the coin.

=== Chinese mint marks ===
Mint marks on coins issued from 1644 until 1661:

| Mint mark (Traditional Chinese) | Mint mark (Simplified Chinese) | Issuing office | Image |
|---|---|---|---|
| 戶 | 户 | The Ministry of Revenue, Beijing | |
| 工 | 工 | The Ministry of Public Works, Beijing | |
| 陝 | 陕 | Xi'an, Shaanxi | |
| 臨 | 临 | Linqing garrison, Shandong | |
| 宣 | 宣 | Xuanhua garrison, Zhili | |
| 延 | 延 | Yansui garrison, Shanxi | |
| 原 | 原 | Taiyuan, Shanxi | |
| 西 | 西 | Shanxi provincial mint | |
| 雲 | 云 | Miyun garrison, Zhili | |
| 同 | 同 | Datong garrison, Shanxi | |
| 荊 | 荆 | Jingzhou garrison, Hubei | |
| 河 | 河 | Kaifeng, Henan | |
| 昌 | 昌 | Wuchang, Hubei | |
| 甯 | 宁 | Jiangning, Jiangsu | |
| 江 | 江 | Nanchang, Jiangxi | |
| 浙 | 浙 | Hangzhou, Zhejiang | |
| 福 | 福 | Fuzhou, Fujian | |
| 陽 | 阳 | Yanghe garrison, Shaanxi | |
| 襄 | 襄 | Xiangyang, Hubei | |

From 1653 until 1657 another type of cash coin was simultaneously cast with the above series, but these coins contained the extra inscription of "一厘" (Equals one lí of silver) on the back. They were generally minted at the same mints as the above cash coin series but were not minted at the Yansui garrison, Shanxi province, and the Jingzhou garrison while another mint at Jinan, Shandong was opened for these coins, with coins cast there bearing the mark "東". Additionally there were also coins cast with no mint mark that only contain the character "一" (1) on their reserves indicating their value in Ií.

Between 1660 and 1661 cash coins were manufactured with both a Manchu (on the left), and a Chinese (on the right) character as mint marks. The following mints produced these coins:

| Mint mark (Traditional Chinese) | Mint mark (Simplified Chinese) | Issuing office | Image |
|---|---|---|---|
| 陝 | 陕 | Xi'an, Shaanxi | |
| 臨 | 临 | Linqing garrison, Shandong | |
| 宣 | 宣 | Xuanhua garrison, Zhili | |
| 薊 | 蓟 | Jizhou garrison, Zhili | |
| 原 | 原 | Taiyuan, Shanxi | |
| 同 | 同 | Datong garrison, Shanxi | |
| 河 | 河 | Kaifeng, Henan | |
| 昌 | 昌 | Wuchang, Hubei | |
| 甯 | 宁 | Jiangning, Jiangsu | |
| 寧 | 宁 | Ningbo, Zhejiang | |
| 江 | 江 | Nanchang, Jiangxi | |
| 浙 | 浙 | Hangzhou, Zhejiang | |
| 東 | 东 | Jinan, Shandong | |

Under the reign of the Kangxi Emperor coins with only Manchu reverse inscriptions and both Manchu and Chinese reverse inscriptions were cast. The coins of the Kangxi Emperor were also the basis for the coins of the Yongzheng, Qianlong, and Jiaqing Emperors.

Under the Kangxi Emperor coins were produced at these mints:

| Mint mark (Traditional Chinese) | Mint mark (Simplified Chinese) | Issuing office | Image |
|---|---|---|---|
| 同 | 同 | Datong garrison, Shanxi | |
| 福 | 福 | Fuzhou, Fujian | |
| 臨 | 临 | Linqing garrison, Shandong | |
| 東 | 东 | Jinan, Shandong | |
| 江 | 江 | Nanchang, Jiangxi | |
| 宣 | 宣 | Xuanhua garrison, Zhili | |
| 原 | 原 | Taiyuan, Shanxi | |
| 蘇 | 苏 | Suzhou, Jiangsu | |
| 薊 | 蓟 | Jizhou garrison, Zhili | |
| 昌 | 昌 | Wuchang, Hubei | |
| 甯 | 宁 | Jiangning, Jiangsu | |
| 河 | 河 | Kaifeng, Henan | |
| 南 | 南 | Changsha, Hunan | |
| 廣 | 广 | Guangzhou, Guangdong | |
| 浙 | 浙 | Hangzhou, Zhejiang | |
| 臺 | 台 | Taiwan | |
| 桂 | 桂 | Guilin, Guangxi | |
| 陝 | 陕 | Xi'an, Shaanxi | |
| 雲 | 云 | Yunnan | |
| 漳 | 漳 | Zhangzhou, Fujian | |
| 鞏 | 巩 | Gongchang, Gansu | |
| 西 | 西 | Shanxi provincial mint | |
| 寧 | 宁 | Ningbo, Zhejiang | |

=== Manchu mint marks ===
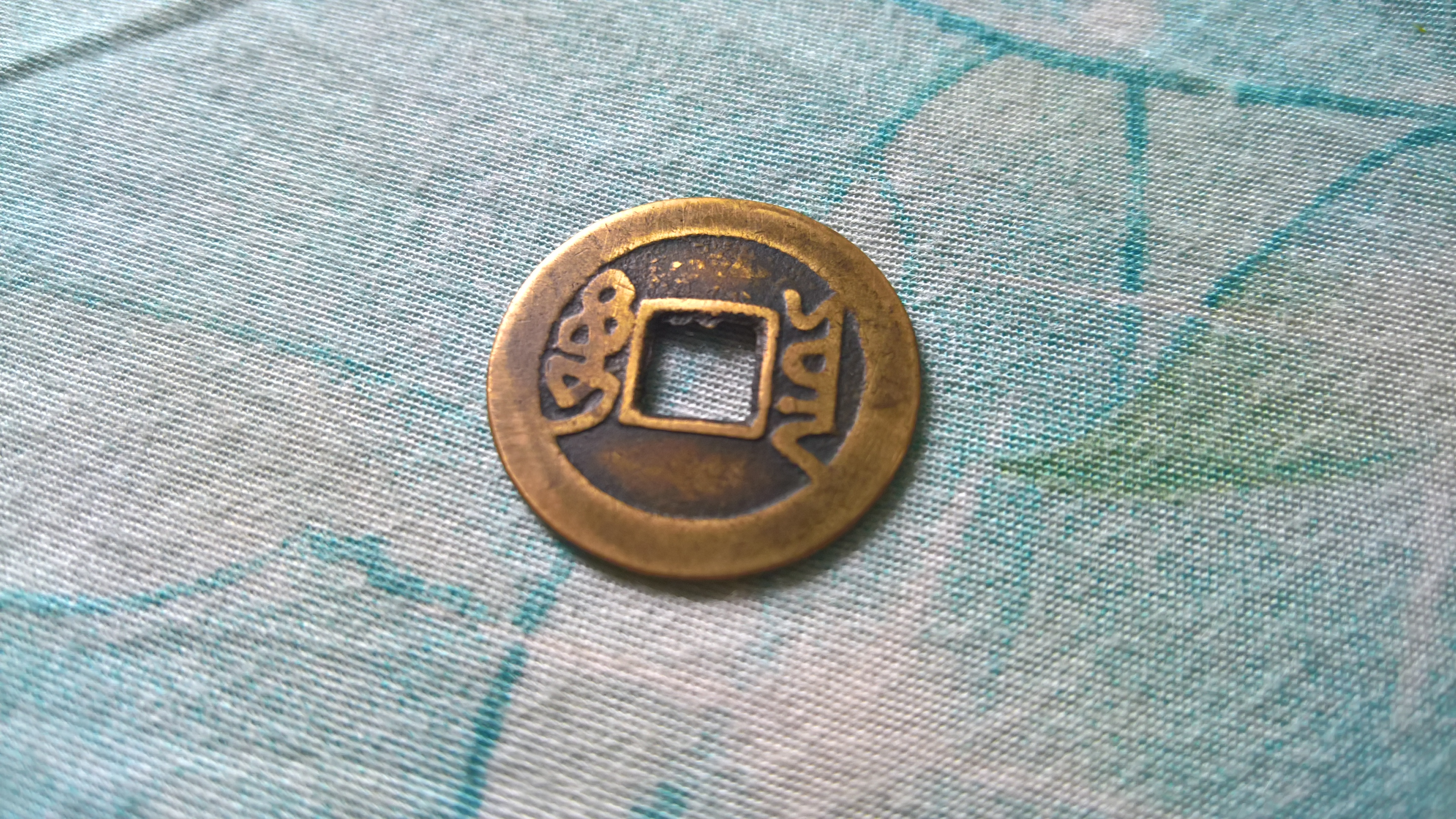
ᠪᠣᠣ ᠶᠣᠨᠨ mint mark on a Xuān Tǒng Tōng Bǎo (宣統通寶) coin indicating that it was cast in Kunming, Yunnan.

Another series of bronze cash coins was introduced with Manchu script on the reverse sides of the coin from 1657, many mints contained the Manchu word ᠪᠣᠣ (Boo) on the left, which is Manchu for "寶" (indicating "treasure" or "currency") on the obverse side of these coins. To the right of them would often appear a word indicating the issuing agency of the coin. Qing dynasty coinage with exclusive Manchu mint marks are by far the most commonly produced type. Large denomination cash coins of the Xianfeng Emperor bore Manchu mint marks on the left and right sides of the reverse sides, and the value of the coin on the top and bottom. Coins with exclusive Manchu inscriptions continued to be cast until the end of the Qing dynasty.

Manchu mint marks are:

| Mint mark | Möllendorff | Place of minting | Province | Time in operation | Image |
|---|---|---|---|---|---|
| Manchu: ᠪᠣᠣ ᠴᡳᠣᠸᠠᠨ | Boo Ciowan | Ministry of Revenue (hùbù, 戶部), Beijing | Zhili | 1644–1911 | |
| Manchu: ᠪᠣᠣ ᠶᡠᠸᠠᠨ | Boo Yuwan | Ministry of Public Works (gōngbù, 工部), Beijing | Zhili | 1644–1908 | |
| Manchu: ᠰᡳᡠᠸᠠᠨ | Siowan | Xuanfu | Zhili | 1644–1671 | |
| Manchu: ᠪᠣᠣ ᠰᠠᠨ | Boo San | Xi'an | Shaanxi | 1644–1908 | |
| Manchu: ᠯᡳᠨ | Lin | Linqing | Shandong | 1645–1675 | |
| Manchu: ᡤᡳ | Gi | Jizhou (蓟) | Zhili | 1645–1671; 1854 | |
| Manchu: ᠪᠣᠣ ᡷᡳ | Boo Zhi | Baoding | Zhili | 1747–1899 | |
| Manchu: ᡨᡠᠩ | Tung | Datong | Shanxi | 1645–1649; 1656–1674 | |
| Manchu: ᠶᡠᠸᠠᠨ(1645–1729) ᠪᠣᠣ ᠵᡳᠨ (1729–1908) | Yuwan (1645–1729); Boo Jin (1729–1908) | Taiyuan | Shanxi | 1645–1908 | |
| Manchu: ᠶᡡᠨ | Yūn | Miyun | Zhili | 1645–1671 | |
| Manchu: ᠴᠠᠩ(1646–1729) ᠪᠣᠣ ᡠ (1729–1908) | Cang (1646–1729); Boo U (1729–1908) | Wuchang, Wuhan | Hubei | 1646–1908 | |
| Manchu: ᠪᠣᠣ ᡥᠣ | Boo Ho | Kaifeng | Henan | 1647; 1729–1731; 1854–1908 | |
| Manchu: ᠪᠣᠣ ᡶᡠᠩ | Boo Fung | Fengtian | Fengtian | 1647–1648; 1880–1908 | |
| Manchu: ᠪᠣᠣ ᠴᠠᠩ (1647–1729) ᡤᡳᠶᠠᠩ (1729–1908) | Boo Chang (1647–1729); Giyang (1729–1908) | Nanchang | Jiangxi | 1647–1908 | |
| Manchu: ᠨᡳᠩ | Ning | Jiangning | Jiangsu | 1648–1731 | |
| Manchu: ᠪᠣᠣ ᡶᡠ | Boo Fu | Fuzhou | Fujian | 1649–1908 | |
| Manchu: ᠪᠣᠣ ᠵᡝ | Boo Je | Hangzhou | Zhejiang | 1649–1908 | |
| Manchu: ᡩᡠᠩ (1649–1729; 1887–1908) ᠪᠣᠣ ᠵᡳ (1729–1887) | Dung (1649–1729; 1887–1908); Boo Ji (1729–1887) | Jinan | Shandong | 1649–1738; 1854–1870; 1887–1908 | |
| Manchu: ᠪᠣᠣ ᠶᠣᠨᠨ | Boo Yonn | Kunming | Yunnan | 1653–1908 | |
| Manchu: ᠪᠣᠣ ᠴᡠᠸᠠᠨ | Boo Cuwan | Chengdu | Sichuan | 1667–1908 | |
| Manchu: ᡤᡠᠩ | Gung | Gongchang | Gansu | 1667–1740; 1855–1908 | |
| Manchu: ᠪᠣᠣ ᠰᡠ | Boo Su | Suzhou | Jiangsu | 1667–1908 | |
| Manchu: ᠪᠣᠣ ᠨᠠᠨ | Boo Nan | Changsha | Hunan | 1667–1908 | |
| Manchu: ᠪᠣᠣ ᡤᡠᠸᠠᠩ | Boo Guwang | Guangzhou | Guangdong | 1668–1908 | |
| Manchu: ᠪᠣᠣ ᡤᡠᡳ | Boo Gui | Guilin | Guangxi | 1668–1908 | |
| Manchu: ᠪᠣᠣ ᡤᡳᠶᠠᠨ | Boo Giyan | Guiyang | Guizhou | 1668–1908 | |
| Manchu: ᠵᠠᠩ | Jang | Zhangzhou | Fujian | 1680–1682 | |
| Manchu: ᠪᠣᠣ ᡨᠠᡳ | Boo Tai | Taiwan-Fu | Taiwan | 1689–1740; 1855–Unknown | |
| Manchu: ᠪᠣᠣ ᠠᠨ | Boo An | Jiangning, Jiangsu | Anhui | 1731–1734 | |
| Manchu: ᠪᠣᠣ ᡷᡳ | Boo Jy | Baoding | Zhili | 1745–1908 | |
| Manchu: ᠶᡝᡵᡴᡳᠶᠠᠩ | Yerkiyang | Yarkant | Xinjiang | 1759–1864 | |
| Manchu: ᡠᠰᡥᡳ | Ushi | Uši | Xinjiang | 1766–1911 | |
| Manchu: ᠪᠣᠣ ᡳ | Boo I | Ghulja | Xinjiang | 1775–1866 | |
| Manchu: ᠪᠣᠣ ᠶᠣᠨᠨ (1733–1799) ᠪᠣᠣ ᡩᠣᠩ (1799–1908) | Boo Yonn (1733–1799); Boo Dong (1799–1908) | Dongchuan | Yunnan | 1733–1908 | |
| Manchu: ᠪᠣᠣ ᡬᡳ | Boo Gi | Jizhou (蓟); Jilin (吉) | Hebei (1851–1861); Jilin (1861–1912) | 1851–1912 | |
| Manchu: ᠪᠣᠣ ᡩᡝ | Boo De | Jehol | Zhili | 1854–1858 | |
| Manchu: ᡴᠠᠰᡥᡤᠠᡵ | Kashgar | Kashgar | Xinjiang | 1855–1908 | |
| Manchu: ᠪᠣᠣ ᡩᡳ (1855–1886; 1907–1908) ᠶᡠᠸᠠᠨ (1886–1907) | Boo Di (1855–1886; 1907–1908); Yuwan (1886–1907) | Ürümqi | Xinjiang | 1855–1864; 1886–1890; 1907–1908 | |
| Manchu: ᡴᡠᠴᠠ | Kuca | Kucha | Xinjiang | 1857–1908 | |
| Manchu: ᠪᠣᠣ ᠵᡳᠶᡝᠨ | Boo Jiyen | Tianjin | Zhili | 1880–1908 | |
| Manchu: ᡥᡡ | Hu | Dagu | Zhili | 1880–1908 | |
| Manchu: ᠪᠣᠣ ᡤᡠᠩ | Boo Gung | Kunshan | Jiangsu | | |
| Manchu: ᠠᡴᠰᡠ | Aksu | Aksu | Xinjiang | | |
| Manchu: ᠵᡳᠩ | Jing | Jingzhou-Fu | Hubei | 1648–1657 | |

=== Chinese, Manchu, and Uyghur mint marks ===
Additionally coins from southern Xinjiang province can also have 3 different scripts on the reverse side of the coin being Manchu, Chinese, and Arabic scripts. An example would be a coin from Aksu would have the Chinese 阿 on top, the Manchu ᠠᡴᠰᡠ on the left, and the Uyghur Perso-Arabic ئاقسۇ on the right. Another differentiating feature of Xinjiang coins is that they tend to be more red in colour reflecting on the colour of the local copper mined in the province.

== Commemorative coins ==
- In 1713, a special Kāng Xī Tōng Bǎo (康熙通寶) cash coin was issued to commemorate the sixtieth birthday of the Kangxi Emperor, these bronze coins were produced with a special yellowish colour, and these cash coins believed to have "the powers of a charm" immediately when it entered circulation, this commemorative coin contains a slightly different version of the Hanzi symbol "熙", at the bottom of the cash, as this character would most commonly have a vertical line at the left part of it but did not have it, and the part of this symbol which was usually inscribed as "臣" has the middle part written as a "口" instead. Notably, the upper left area of the symbol "通" only contains a single dot as opposed of the usual two dots used during this era. Several myths were attributed to this coin over the following 300 years since it has been cast such as the myth that the coin was cast from molten down golden statues of the 18 disciples of the Buddha which earned this coin the nicknames "the Lohan coin" and "Arhat money". These commemorative kāng xī tōng bǎo cash coins were given to children as yā suì qián (壓歲錢) during Chinese new year, some women wore them akin to how an engagement ring is worn today, and in rural Shanxi young men wore this special kāng xī tōng bǎo cash coin between their teeth like men from cities had golden teeth. Despite the myths surrounding this coin it was made from a copper-alloy and did not contain any gold but it was not uncommon for people to enhance the coin with gold leaf.
- Commemorative silver coins with the portrait of the Panchen Lama of Tibet are known to be produced during the Qianlong reign.
- In 1905, the Qing dynasty issued special silver 1 tael Guāng Xù Yuán Bǎo (光緒元寶) coins celebrating the 70th birthday of Empress Dowager Cixi. These coins feature the Chinese character for longevity (壽) surrounded by 2 Imperial dragons reaching out to the wish-granting pearl.

== Foreign silver "dollars" circulating in the Qing dynasty ==
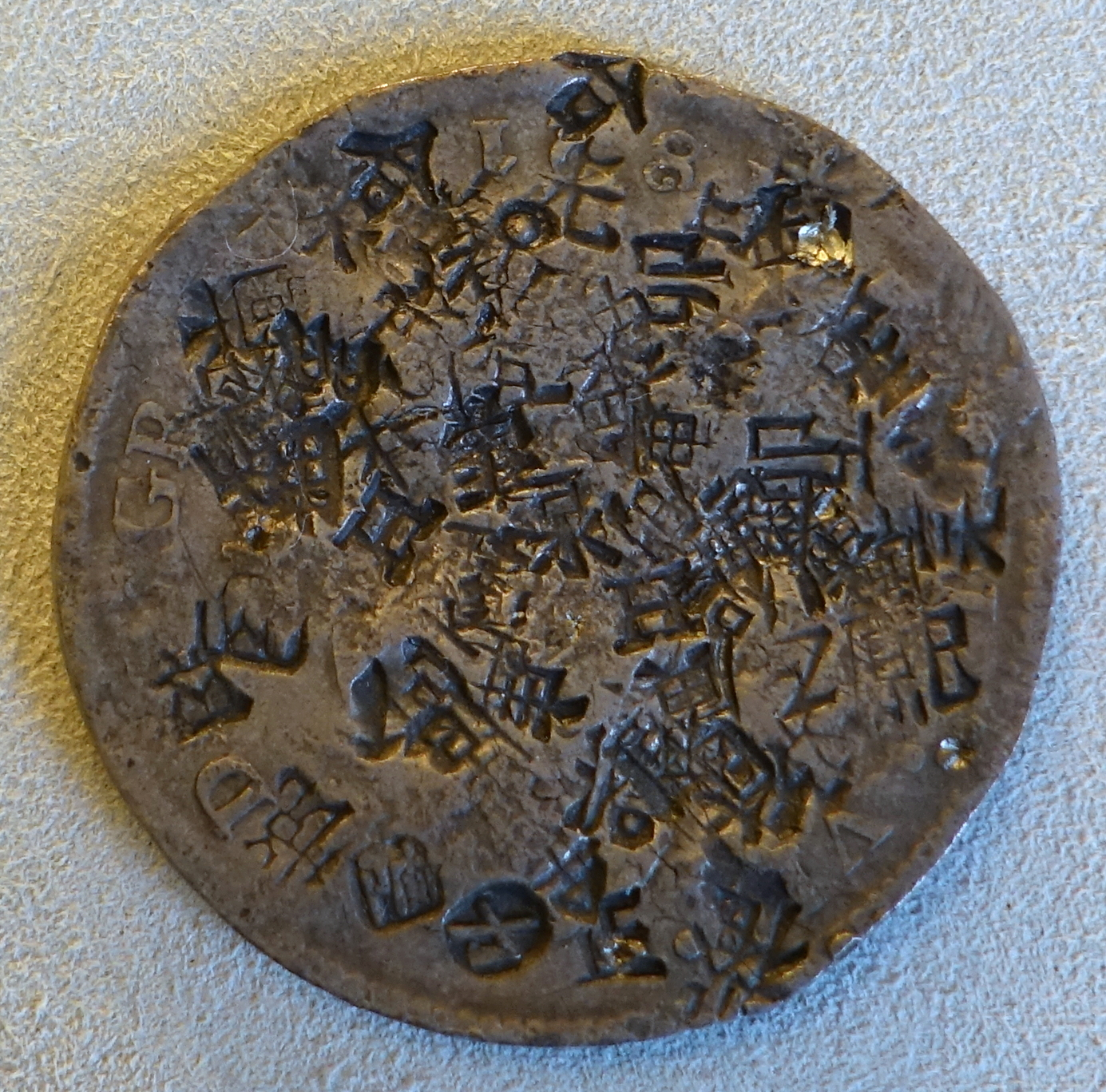
A chopmarked Spanish 8 reales coin.

Under the reign of the Qing dynasty foreign silver coins entered China in large numbers, these silver coins were known in China as the Yangqian (洋錢, "ocean money") or Fanqian (番錢, "barbarian money"). During the 17th and 18th centuries Chinese trade with European merchants was in a constant rise, as the Chinese were not consumers of larger contingents of commodities from Europe they largely received foreign silver currency for their exports. As the Europeans discovered a vast quantity of silver mines in the Americas the status of silver rose to be that of an international currency and silver became the most important metal used in international transactions globally, this also had a profound impact on the value of Chinese silver. Other than trade, Europeans were interested in the Chinese market due to the high interest rates on loans paid out to Chinese merchants in Guangzhou by the Europeans. Another common reason why European merchants traded with the Chinese was because as various types of precious metals had different prices around the world the price of gold was much lower in China than in Europe. Meanwhile, Chinese merchants used copper-alloy cash coins to purchase silver from the Europeans and Japanese during this period.

Silver coins largely circulated in the coastal provinces of China and the most important form of silver were the foreign silver coins that circulated in China and these were known under many different names often dependent on the imagery depicted on them. According to the 1618 book Dong-Xiyang Kao (東西洋考) a chapter on the local products of the island of Luzon in the Spanish East Indies (Philippines) mentions that Chinese observers witnessed a silver coin that came from New Spain (Mexico) while other Chinese observers would claim that it came from Spain. These silver dollars came from the North American part of New Spain to the Philippines through the Manila galleons in the Manila-Acapulco Galleon Trade and were brought to Quanzhou, Zhangzhou, Guangzhou, Macau, Xiamen, and Ningbo by Chinese merchants.

Trade with the Kingdom of Portugal commenced after the Portuguese occupation of Macau in 1557 and two decades later trade with Castile was established, trade with the Dutch Republic started in 1604 with their occupation of the Penghu islands, and with the Kingdom of Great Britain in 1729. By the end of the eighteenth century China was also trading with the newly established United States of America. Despite Chinese merchants valuing both foreign silver coins (銀元) and Chinese silver ingots (銀兩) based on their silver content, the government of the Qing dynasty still enforced the opinion that the silver coins that originated in foreign countries was somehow of inferior value than the Chinese sycees. Yet the private Chinese markets did not share this opinion with the imperial Qing government as the populations of the coastal provinces (and Guangdong most in particular) held the foreign silver coins in high esteem due to various advantages such as their fixed nominal values and their consistently reliable fineness of their silver content which all made them be used for transactions without having to undergo a process of assaying or weighing as is expected of sycees.

The year 1814 the market value of 1 silver foreign coin in Guangzhou was never less than 723 Chinese cash coins, while in other provinces like Jiangsu and Zhejiang they were even worth more eight hundred cash coins, or foreign silver coins could be traded for 0.73 tael of silver each. The following decades the exchange ratee would only rise and a single foreign silver coin would be worth between 1,500 and 1,900 Chinese cash coins. The Chinese authorities during this period for this reason often raised the proposition to ban the circulation of foreign silver coins within Chinese territory, on the suspicion that "good" Chinese silver went to foreign markets, while the "inferior" foreign silver coins caused the markets of southern China to inundate. There was evidence that the Qing dynasty indeed suffered a net loss of 11% when changing Chinese into foreign silver. During the initial period of the 19th century the imperial Chinese administration suspected that more silver was being exported than imported causing the Chinese to slowly develop a silver deficit as the trade balance fell on the negative side of the spectrum for the Qing. However, as the government of the Qing dynasty never collected and compiled any statistics on the private trade of silver it is very difficult to generate any accurate hard numbers on these claims. According to Hosea Ballou Morse the turning point for the Chinese trade balance was in the year 1826, during this year the trade balance allegedly fell from a positive balance of 1,300,000 pesos to a negative one of 2,100,000 pesos.

According to the memorial by the governor of Fujian, L. Tsiuen-Sun published on 7 November 1855 it is noted that the governor witnessed that the foreign silver coins that had been circulating in Jiangnan were held in great esteem by the local people and that the most excellent of these coins weighed 7 Mace and 2 Candareens while their silver content was only of 6 Mace and 5 Candareens. He also noted that these coins were greatly used in Fujian and Guangdong and that even the most defaced and mutilated of these coins were valued on par with Chinese sycees, in fact he noted that everyone in possession of a sycee would exchange these for foreign silver coins known as Fanbing (番餅, "foreign cakes") due to their standard weights and sizes. Meanwhile, the governor noted that in the provinces of Zhejiang and Jiangsu these chopped dollars did not circulate as much in favour of a currency he calls "bright money". Originally a dollar was worth upwards of seven Mace; the value gradually rose over time to eight Mace, and by 1855 it exceeded nine Mace.

=== Pre-Qing trade ===
Between the 16th and 18th centuries a vast amount of foreign silver coins arrived in the Qing dynasty. During the early years of Sino-Portuguese trade at the port of Macau, the merchants from the Kingdom of Portugal purchased an annual amount of two million taels worth of Chinese commodities, additionally the Portuguese shipped about 41 million taels (or 1.65 million kilograms) of silver from Japan to China until the year 1638. A century earlier in the year 1567 the Spanish trade port in the city of Manila in the Philippines as part of the Spanish colonial empire was opened which until the fall of the Ming dynasty brought over forty million Kuping Taels of silver to China with the annual Chinese imports numbering at 53,000,000 pesos (each peso being 8 real) or 300,000 Kuping Taels. During the Ming dynasty the average Chinese junk which took the voyage from the Spanish East Indies to the city of Guangzhou took with it eighty thousand pesos, a number which increased under the Qing dynasty as until the mid-18th century the volume of imported Spanish pesos had increased to 235,370,000 (or 169 460,000 Kuping Tael). The Spanish mention that around 12,000,000 pesos were shipped from Acapulco to Manila in the year 1597 as part of the Manila-Acapulco Galleon Trade while in other years this usually numbered between one and four million pesos. The Japanese supplied 11,250 kilograms of silver to China by merchants in direct trade annually prior to the year 1600, after the Sakoku policy was enacted by the Tokugawa shogunate in the year 1633 only 350 Japanese trade vessels sailed for China, however each of these ships had more than one thousand tons of silver.

=== Names of foreign silver coins ===
List of names used for foreign silver coins during the reign of the Qing dynasty:

| Name | Traditional Chinese | Simplified Chinese | Literal translation | Foreign silver coin | Image |
|---|---|---|---|---|---|
| Maqian; Majian | 馬錢 馬劍 | 马钱 马剑 | "Horse money" "Horse-and-sword [money]" | Dutch ducaton | |
| Shangqiu; Shuangzhu; Zhuyang | 雙球 雙柱 柱洋 | 双球 双柱 柱洋 | "Double ball [dollar]" "Double-pillar [dollar]" "Pillar dollar" | Spanish dollars issued under King Philip V and King Ferdinand VI | |
| Benyang; Fotouyang | 本洋 佛頭洋 | 本洋 佛头洋 | "Main dollar" (Note: This was probably in contrast to the other foreign silver coins that circulated in China at the time.) "Buddha-head dollar" | Spanish Carolus dollar | |
| Sangong (Note: Not knowing Latin script and by extend Roman numerals, the Chinese people at the time used to interpret the serif-style letters III and IIII (a substitute for "IV") as multiples of the character 工.) | 三工 | 三工 | "Three Gong's" | Spanish dollars produced under King Charles III | |
| Sigong | 四工 | 四工 | "Four Gong's" | Spanish dollars produced under King Charles IV | |
| Huabianqian | 花邊錢 | 花边钱 | "Decorated-rim money" | Machine-struck Spanish Carolus dollars produced after 1732 | |
| Yingyang | 鷹洋 英洋 | 鹰洋 英洋 | "Eagle coin" "English Dollar" (Note: Often erroneously or for the reason of simplicity written as if it was an "English Dollar".) | Mexican peso | |
| Shiziqian | 十字錢 | 十字钱 | "Cross money" | Portuguese cruzado | |
| Daji; Xiaoji | 大髻 小髻 | 大髻 小髻 | "Large curls" "Small curls" (Note: Note that the "curls" in this context refers to the wigs of the Spanish kings.) | Spanish dollar | |
| Pengtou | 蓬頭 | 蓬头 | "Unbound hair" (Note: "Unbound hair" refers to the Goddess of Liberty which was depicted as having loose hair.) | United States dollar United States trade dollar | |
| Bianfu | 蝙蝠 | 蝙蝠 | "Bat" (Note: It is speculated that this nickname came from a misinterpretation that either the Mexican or American eagle was a bat.) | Mexican peso or United States dollar | |
| Zhanrenyang; Zhangyang | 站人洋 仗洋 | 站人洋 仗洋 | "Standing person dollar" "Weapon dollar" | British dollar | |
| Longyang; Longfan; Longyin | 龍洋 龍番 龍銀 | 龙洋 龙番 龙银 | "Dragon dollar" "Dragon foreign [dollar]" "Dragon silver" | Silver Dragon | |

=== Spanish dollars and Mexican pesos from the Philippines ===
The paramount foreign silver coin in Chinese history was the Spanish piece of eight (or 8 reals and commonly called a peso or dollar) originally entering in circulation through trade with Manila in the Philippines to the cities of Quanzhou, Zhangzhou, Xiamen in Fujian and Guangzhou and Macau in Guangdong. The Philippines, as part of the Spanish East Indies, exported to and was supplied through the Manila-Acapulco Galleon Trade with the Viceroyalty of New Spain (Mexico), all as part of the Spanish colonial empire. It was known popularly in English as the Spanish dollar, however to the Chinese this coin was popularly known as the double ball (雙球) because its obverse depicted two different hemispheres of the globe based on the 1494 Treaty of Tordesillas which divided the world between the Crown of Castile and the Kingdom of Portugal and the Algarves.

The silver "double ball" coins were issued under the reigns of King Philip V and King Ferdinand VI between the years 1700 and 1759 and were minted in the Viceroyalty of New Spain (Mexico) which was signified by the mint mark "Mo" ("M[exic]o") and featured Latin texts such as "VTRAQUE VNUM" ("both [hemispheres] are one [empire]") and "HISPAN·ET·IND·REX" ("king of Spain and the Indies") preceded with the name of the reigning monarch. The globes on these early Spanish dollars were flanked by two crowned pillars (representing the Pillars of Hercules), these pillars were entwined with S-shaped banners (which is also the origin of the peso sign, $).

Under the reign of King Charles III the design was changed and the pillars were moved to the reverse of the coin while of the Spanish coat-of-arms were superseded by a portrait of the reigning monarch, because of this these coins were known as "Carolus dollars" or columnarius ("with columns") in the West, while the Chinese referred to them as Zhuyan (柱洋, "pillar dollar"). Additionally on some Carolus dollars the inscription "PLVS VLTRA" was found. The Spanish Carolus dollars always had a standard weight of 27.468 grams, while their silver content was lowered from 0.93955 to a purity of only 0.902. From the year 1732 onwards these coins were manufactured in Mexico City and other parts of Spanish America. The portraits of kings Charles III and Charles IV (with the "IV" written as "IIII") were featured on these coins, the Chinese referred to the Latin numeral "I" as "工" causing the silver coins of Charles III to be known as Sangong (三工) while those produced under the reign of Charles IV were known as Sigong (四工) coins.

Additionally the depiction of the reigning Spanish monarch inspired the Chinese people to refer these Carolus dollars as Fotou Yang (佛頭洋, "Buddha-head dollar"). The Carolus dollar came in the denominations of ½ real, 1 real, 2 reales, 4 reales, and 8 reales of which the highest denomination had a diameter of forty millimeters and a thickness of 2.5 millimeters. All Carolus dollars issued under the reign of Charles III to China were produced in the year 1790 while those under Charles IV all date from 1804 onwards.

In daily exchange the Chinese rated the 8 reales Carolus dollars at 0.73 Kuping Tael and was one of the most important forms of exchange, the Treaty of Nanking that ended the First Opium War had its payments measured in Spanish Carolus dollars. According to estimates by the British East India Company the Qing dynasty imported 68,000,000 Taels worth of foreign silver coins between the years 1681 and 1833, this sets China's imports over 100,000,000 foreign silver coins with the bulk of these being Spanish Carolus dollars produced in Spanish America that entered China through trade.

The Chinese preference of the old Spanish Carolus dollars over newer European silver coinage, Mexican real, Peruvian real (later the Peruvian sol, and the Bolivian sol (later the Bolivian boliviano) was considered to be "unjustified" by many foreign powers, it took the combined diplomatic interventions of the United Kingdom, France and the United States to lead to a proclamation by Shanghainese superintendent of customs, Chaou, to issue a decree that was dated 23 July 1855, commanding the general circulation of all foreign silver coins, whether they were new or old coinages. One of the reasons why the circulation of other silver coins other than the Spanish Carolus dollars because the Spanish government has long since stopped the production of these coins as the Spanish American wars of independence cut them off of the majority of their colonies, this had the effect that while no new Spanish Carolus dollars were being produced many Chinese merchants started demanding more money for them as these coins started slowly but gradually disappearing from the Chinese market. As many foreign nations started trading with China, the Chinese regarded these non-Spanish currencies as "new coins" and often discounted them from 20 to 30 percent due to the suspicion that they had a lower silver content than the Spanish Carolus dollars.

After Mexican independence was declared, the Mexican Empire started issuing silver pesos with their coat of arms on them, these silver coins were brought to China from 1854 and were known to the Chinese as "Eagle coins" (鷹洋), though they have commonly been incorrectly called "English dollars" (英洋) because they were mostly brought to China by English merchants. The denominations of these coins remained the same as with the earlier Spanish dollars but the currency unit "real" was replaced with "peso".

Initially the Chinese market did not respond positively to this change of design and accepted the Mexican pesos at a lower rate than they did the Spanish Carolus dollars due to a fear that they might have a lower silver content, but after members the customs house of Shanghai were inviter to see the manufacturing process of the Mexican peso by the foreign mercantile community they concluded that these new coins were of equal quality and purity as the old Spanish Carolus dollars and decreed that after the next Chinese new year Chinese merchants in Shanghai can not demand a premium on transactions made in Mexican pesos and that all foreign coins would have to be judged on their intrinsic value and not on the fact if it was a Spanish Carolus dollar or not, the reason why this decree was passed was due to the widespread dishonesty among the Chinese merchants overcharging transactions paid in Mexican pesos claiming that only Spanish Carolus dollars were trustworthy. This request was also forwarded to all governors of the coastal provinces, however despite the push by the Chinese authorities of the Qing to bring fiscal parity between the Spanish Carolus dollar and the Mexican peso, the Chinese people still held high esteem for the former and the prejudices favouring Spanish Carolus dollars did not cease.

On the 26th day of the 1st month during the year Xianfeng 6 (2 March 1856) the Taoutae (or highest civil officer) of Luzhou-fu, Longjiang-fu, and Taichangzhou who also served as the acting Commissioner of Finance for Luzhou-fu as other places in Jiangnan issued a proclamation condemning the practice of discounting the value of good Spanish dollars and making it illegal to do so, Taoutae Yang cited that there were cunning stockjobbers who have been getting up a set of clever nicknames which they give to Spanish Carolus dollars out of self-interest to try and devalue certain coins and heavily discount them. Some time after the proclamation these dealers stopped fearing the law and continued their practice.

It was notable that certain types of Spanish dollars known as the "copper-mixed-dollar", the "inlaid-with-lead-dollar", the "light-dollar", and the "Foochoow dollar" were particularly targeted this proclamation as they were perceived to be intrinsically of less value, according to Eduard Kann in his book The Currencies of China he reports in Appendix IV: "A feature of Foochow currency is the chopped, or rather the scooped, the scraped, the cut, the punched dollar. This maltreatment often obliterates all trace of the original markings, some assuming the shape and appearance of a mushroom suffering from smallpox. It is obvious that such coins must pass by weight ..."

The Taoutae argued that the money-changers used absurd tricks in attempting to find a flaw in the Spanish dollar while he argued that these coins were both not lighter in weight nor did they feel inferior in quality when held. The Taoutae argued that the numerous chops on them are proof of the fact that they have been rigorously checked and verified by various Chinese authorities over an extended period of time and that the chopping of these Spanish dollars did not negatively influence them in any way. Money-changers who engaged in illegally downgrading and devaluing Spanish dollars by assigning these nicknames to them in Jiangnan were placed in a cangue. A similar law was also passed by the province of Zhejiang and government clerks aiding these dishonest shopkeepers were also subject to punishment if discovered.

=== Other foreign silver coins ===
The silver ducats of the Dutch Republic were known as the Maqian (馬錢) or Majian (馬劍) to the Chinese and it has been estimated that between the years 1725 and 1756 ships from the Netherlands bought in Canon merchandise for 3.6 million taels worth of silver, but between the years 1756 and 1794 this was only 82.697 tael. In the late 18th century the Dutch silver ducats were primarily circulating in the coastal provinces of Guangdong and Fujian. The smallest of the Dutch ducats had a weight of 0.867 Kuping Tael. The Portuguese cruzado started circulating in the southern provinces of China during the latter part of the 18th century and was dubbed the Shiqiqian (十字錢) by contemporary Chinese merchants. The denominations of the Portuguese cruzado during that time were 50 réis, 60 réis, 100 réis, 120 réis, 240 réis, and 480 réis with the largest coin weighing only 0.56 Kuping Tael. The silver coins of the Japanese yen were first introduced in the year 1870 and circulated in the eastern provinces of the Qing dynasty, they were locally known as Longyang (龍洋, "dragon dollars") or Longpan (龍番) because they featured a big dragon and bore the Kanji inscription Dai Nippon (大日本). These Japanese coins were dominated in yen (圓) and would later serve as the model for the Chinese silver coins produced at the end of the Qing period.

Prior to the first opium war began, around a dozen different types of foreign silver coins were circulating in China, among these was a small amount of French silver écu coins, however Spanish Carolus dollars were by far the most numerous as various trade companies such as the British East India Company purchased Chinese products such as tea with them, as all other foreign currencies were forbidden by the Qing as a means to accept payment for tea. In the year 1866 a new mint was opened in British Hong Kong and the British government started the production of the silver Hong Kong dollar (香港銀圓) that all featured a portrait of the reigning British monarch, Queen Victoria. As these Hong Kong dollars did not have as high of a silver content as the Mexican peso these silver coins were rejected by Chinese merchants and had to be demonetised a mere seven years after they were introduced.

The United States in 1873 created the American trade dollar which was known to the Chinese as the Maoyi Yinyuan (貿易銀元), this coin specially designed for use in the trade with the Qing dynasty. However, because its silver content was lower than that of the Mexican peso, it suffered the same fate as the silver Hong Kong dollar and was discontinued 14 years after its introduction. Afterwards another silver British coin was introduced inspired by the American trade dollar that became known as the British dollar or British trade dollar, these coins featured the inscription "One Dollar" (in English, Chinese, and Malay) and had the portrait of the female personification of the United Kingdom Britannia on them, these silver coins were introduced in the year 1895, and were called either Zhanrenyang (站人洋) or Zhangyang (仗洋) by the Chinese.

== See also ==
- Ancient Chinese coinage
- Economy of the Qing dynasty
- History of Chinese currency
- Liao dynasty coinage
- Manchukuo yuan
- Ming dynasty coinage
- Paper money of the Qing dynasty
- Shengbao (currency)
- Southern Song dynasty coinage
- Western Xia coinage
- Yuan dynasty coinage
- Zhou dynasty coinage

== Sources ==
- Eagleton, C.; Williams, J., Money: a history, London: British Museum Press, 2007.
- Hartill, David (2005). Cast Chinese Coins: A Historical Catalogue. Trafford. ISBN 978-1-4120-5466-9.
- Hartill, David, Qing cash, Royal Numismatic Society Special Publication 37, London, 2003.
- Peng, Xinwei (2007) [1958)]. Zhongguo huobi shi 中國貨幤史 [The History of Chinese currency]. Revised 1970, 1988, 2007 (in Chinese). Shanghai: Shanghai renmin chubanshe.
- Wu Jingzi (吳敬梓), Rulin Waishi (The Scholars).
- Eduard Kann, Illustrated Catalog of Chinese Coins, Vol. 1: Gold, Silver, Nickel and Aluminum ISBN 0923891188
- Chen Feng, Financial History of the Qing Dynasty (1 January 1991) ISBN 710006998X (in Mandarin Chinese using Simplified Chinese characters)
- Werner Burger (numismatist), Ch'ing Cash. Publisher: University Museum and Art Gallery, Hong Kong University. Publication date: 5 July 2016 ISBN 9881902339
- Kalgan Shih, Sam Sloan, and Mario L. Sacripante. Modern Coins of China. Publisher: Ishi Press. Published: 14 December 2009. ISBN 4871878708
- Shi Jun Zhi, Outline of Chinese coins legal history (Chinese Edition). Publisher: China Financial Publishing House. Published: 1 March 2015. ISBN 7504978132

| Preceded by: Ming dynasty coinage Reason: Manchu conquest of China. Ratio: 1 Qing wén for 2 Ming wén. | Currency of China; 1644 – 1912; Note: Used in Manchuria from 1616 onwards. | Succeeded by: Chinese yuan Reason: Wuchang uprising and Xinhai Revolution. |
| Preceded by: Yongli Tongbao cash coins, Spanish dollar Reason: Battle of Penghu | Currency of Taiwan; 1662 – 1895 | Succeeded by: Taiwanese yen Reason: Treaty of Shimonoseki |
| Preceded by: Dzungar pūl Reason: Dzungar–Qing Wars | Currency of Dzungaria; 1760 – 1912 | Succeeded by: Chinese yuan Chinese lac Reason: Xinhai Revolution in Xinjiang |
