= Jibaozhai Museum =

Former museum in Erpu, China

The Jibaozhai Museum (冀宝斋博物馆) was a museum and 'patriotic education center' that was located in the village of Erpu in Jizhou, which is in the province of Hebei. It was closed in 2013 due to a fraud.

== Construction ==
The museum was built in 2007. It contained twelve exhibit halls and 40,000 exhibits. The collection was said to cost 20 million yuan. However, a former accountant from the village claims that the collection was worth 30 million yuan, which has made many in the village suspicious that the museum was a front for money laundering by the local communist party chief, Wang Zongquan.

== Closure ==
On July 6, 2013, a popular writer from Beijing named Ma Boyong visited the museum and discovered that many of the artifacts were fake, and posted this information on his microblog. This led to an investigation by the authorities where it was found that most of the items in the museum were fakes. Exhibits included a vase with contemporary cartoon characters and artifacts that were said to be from 2700 BC but had modern simplified Chinese characters on them. The authorities closed the museum and revoked its license for fraud.
