= Xujiazhuang Township =

Xujiazhuang Township 徐家庄乡
- Township
- Location in Hebei
- Coordinates: 37°32′07″N 115°27′05″E
- Country: People's Republic of China
- Province: Hebei
- Prefecture-level city: Hengshui
- County-level city: Jizhou
- Village-level divisions: 28 villages
- Elevation: 27 m (89 ft)
- Time zone: UTC+8 (China Standard)
- Area code: 0318

Xujiazhuang Township (simplified Chinese: 徐家庄乡; traditional Chinese: 徐家莊鄉; pinyin: Xújiāzhuāng Xiāng) is a township under the administration of Jizhou City in southern Hebei province, China, located about 11 kilometres (6.8 mi) west of downtown Jizhou. As of 2011, it has 28 villages under its administration.

== See also ==
- List of township-level divisions of Hebei
