= Beizhanghuai Township =

Beizhanghuai Township 北漳淮乡
- Rural Township
- Bĕizhānghuái Xiāng
- Location in Hebei Location in China
- Coordinates: 37°25′54″N 115°25′17″E
- Country: People's Republic of China
- Province: Hebei
- Prefecture-level city: Hengshui
- District: Jizhou

Area
  - Total: 56.98 km^{2} (22.00 sq mi)

Population (2010)
  - Total: 21,271
  - Density: 373.3/km^{2} (967/sq mi)
- Time zone: UTC+8 (China Standard)

Beizhanghuai Township (Chinese: 北漳淮乡; pinyin: Bĕizhānghuái Xiāng) is a rural township located in Jizhou District, Hengshui, Hebei, China. According to the 2010 census, Beizhanghuai Township had a population of 21,271, including 10,669 males and 10,602 females. The population was distributed as follows: 2,557 people aged under 14, 16,332 people aged between 15 and 64, and 2,382 people aged over 65.

== See also ==
- List of township-level divisions of Hebei
