= Great Qing Copper Coin =

Currency of the Qing Dynasty

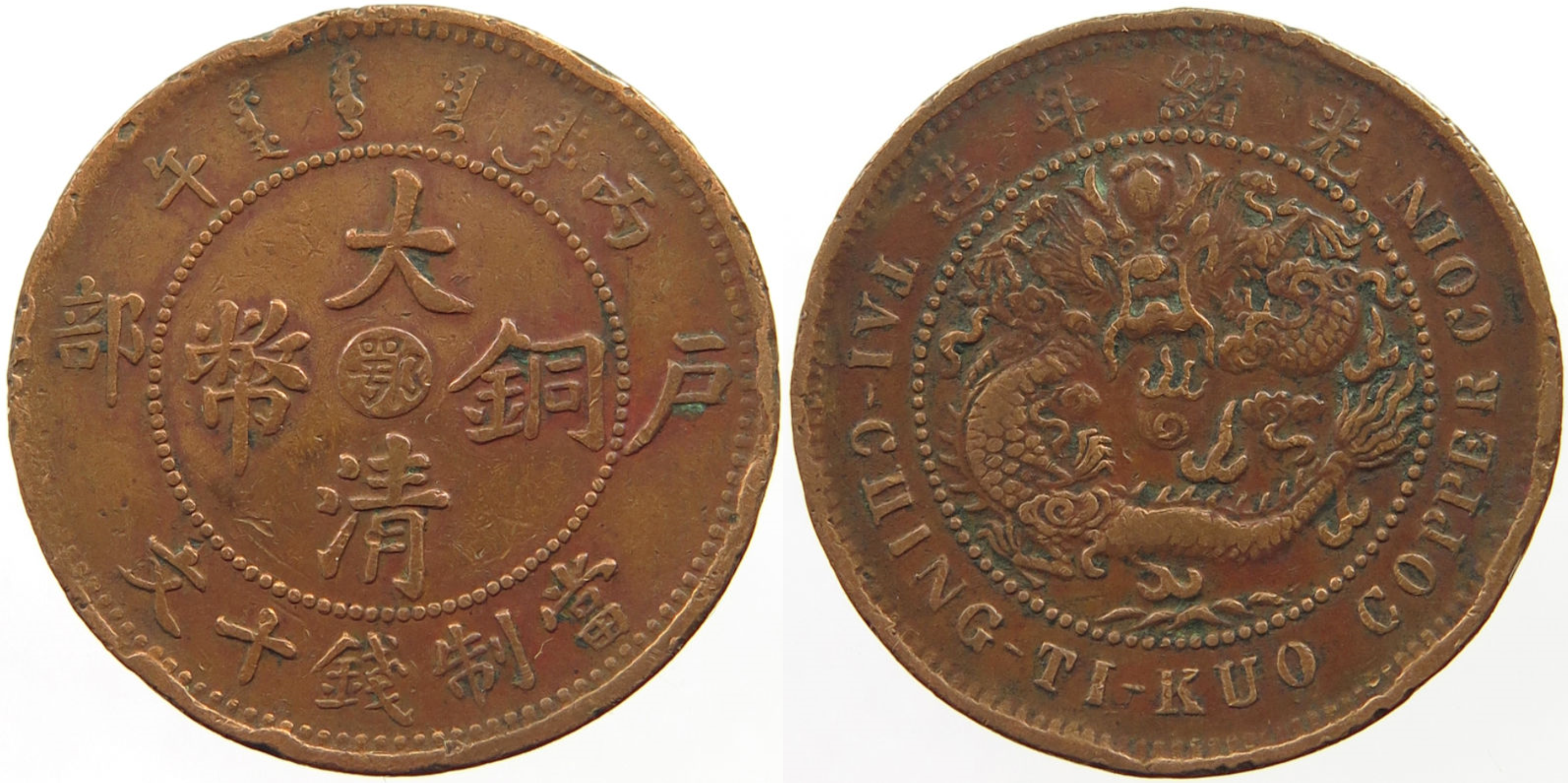
A machine-struck "Great Qing Copper Coin" (大清銅幣) cash coin of 10 wén in standard cash coins.

The Great Qing Copper Coin (simplified Chinese: 大清铜币; traditional Chinese: 大清銅幣; pinyin: Dà Qīng Tóng Bì), also known as the Qing Dynasty Copper Coin or Da-Qing Tongbi, officially the Tai-Ching-Ti-Kuo Copper Coin, refers to a series of copper machine-struck coins from the Qing dynasty produced from 1906 (31st year of Guangxu) until the fall of the Qing dynasty in 1911. These coins were intended to replace the earlier cast cash coins and provincial coinages, but were welcomed to mixed receptions.

Two series of Tongyuan (銅元) were simultaneously in circulation, one carried the inscription Guangxu Yuanbao (光緒元寶), which was also used for silver coins, and the other with the inscription "Great Qing Copper Coin". While the Guangxu Yuanbao were often provincially issued and at first were of different weights, the Great Qing Copper Coin was introduced by the imperial government in the hope of creating a unified national currency system.

== Name ==
The Great Qing Copper Coin featured the English text "Tai-Ching-Ti-Kuo Copper Coin" (where "Tai-Ching-Ti-Kuo" refers to the Qing dynasty), along with Traditional Chinese characters "大清銅幣" (literally "Copper Coin of the Great Qing") which were the names of the coinage in English and Chinese languages. They were used to indicate that this series was supposed to be the standard coinage of the entire Qing empire as opposed to provincial coinages.

In modern English sources, the coinage is often referred to as the "Great Qing Copper Coin" or the "Qing Dynasty Copper Coin", along with pinyin transliterations from the Chinese name "大清銅幣" such as "Da-Qing Tongbi", "Da Qing Tong Bi", and "Daqing Tongbi".

The Qing dynasty had a bimetallic coinage system, and similar titles were also used for other standardised metal coinages such as the silver Great Qing Silver Coin (大清銀幣) and the gold Great Qing Gold Coin (大清金幣).

== History ==
Due to a shortage of copper at the end of the Qing dynasty, the mint of Guangzhou, Guangdong, began striking round copper coins without square holes in June 1900. They were called Tóngyuán (銅元) or Tóngbǎn (銅板) and they were struck in denominations of 1, 2, 5, 10, 20, and 30 wén. These struck coins were well received because of their higher quality compared to cast coins and their convenience in carriage, as well as their uniform weight and copper content compared to the less consistent alloys of cast Chinese coinage. As these coins were profitable to manufacture it did not take long before other provinces started making machine-struck cash coins too, and soon 20 bureaus were opened across China. As these coins became more common, they eventually replaced the old cast coins as the main medium of exchange for small purchases among the Chinese people. The first of these provincial machine-struck copper-alloy coins had the inscription Guangxu Yuanbao (光緒元寶) and a weight of 7.46 grams. These early Cantonese milled coinage were inspired by copper coins from British Hong Kong. Due to the success of these Cantonese milled coins, the government of the province of Fujian started minting their own version of this coin in August 1900.

From the year 1901, the provinces of Jiangsu, Hubei, Anhui, Zhejiang, Fengtian, Hunan, Beiyang Zhili, Sichuan, Jiangxi, Jilin, Shandong, Henan, Guangxi, and Yunnan had all begun to manufacture milled copper-alloy coins and distributed them nationwide. They became so popular that by the 31st year of the Guangxu Emperor (1906) they were being produced at 15 different bureaus in 12 provinces.

The government of the Qing dynasty established a modern coin factory at the Ministry of Revenue Mint (formerly the "Tianjin Silver Money General Mint") in Tianjin in the year 1903 and the mint began to produce milled copper-alloy coins in 1905. At the same time, the government of the Qing dynasty ordered the entire country to produce the Great Qing Copper Coin to replace the former "Guangxu Yuanbao" and unified and standardised national currency system. The government of the Qing dynasty hoped to regain control of its currency system in order to also get more control over its own internal affairs. In the year 1906, the Ministry of Revenue had issued the "Regulations on the Rectification Law" (整頓圜法章程), and had merged 24 mints around China into only 9.

The Great Qing Copper Coins were initially issued in the denominations of 2 wén, 5 wén, 10 wén, and 20 wén with each of these denominations being based on their nominal value in traditional cash coins. The government of the Qing dynasty had produced an excessive amount of 10 wén Great Qing Copper Coins. In the year 1909, the government of the Qing dynasty had ordered the mints to suspend the production of the 10 wén copper coins and produce a smaller denomination brass coin to ease the pressure of the 10 wén Great Qing Copper Coins, but only the provincial mints of Hubei, Jiangning, and Henan complied. The government of the Qing dynasty had issued a new law on currency known as the "Currency Regulations" (幣制則例) in the year 1910 to regulate and standardise the entire Chinese national currency system. In the year 1911, the government of the Qing dynasty had issued the "Xuantong third year" series of copper-alloy coins, but these did not comply with the earlier set national regulations for coinages in China.

== Design ==
The designs of the Great Qing Copper Coin are similar to that of the Guangxu Yuanbao coins, the inscription "Great Qing Copper Coin" (大清銅幣) written in large Traditional Chinese characters occupied the centre part of the obverse side of the coin. In the very centre of the coin, between the "Great Qing Copper Coin" characters, were one or two small Chinese characters indicating the provincial mint where the coin was manufactured.

Near the top of the rim of the coin on the obverse side, there was text written in Manchu (the language of the ruling class of the Qing dynasty) that read ᠪᠠᡩᠠᠷᠠᠩᡤᠠ
ᡩᠣᠷᠣ ᡳ
ᠠᠨᡳᠶᠠᡳ
ᠸᡝᡳᠯᡝᡥᡝ (and later ᡤᡝᡥᡠᠩᡤᡝ
ᠶᠣᠰᠣ ᡳ
ᠠᠨᡳᠶᠠᡳ
ᠸᡝᡳᠯᡝᡥᡝ), meaning "minted during the Guangxu (or Xuantong) years", to indicate the era of mintage (during the reign of Guangxu Emperor or Xuantong Emperor). Near the right and left sides of the outer rim were two Chinese characters representing the "Ministry of the Interior and Finance" (戶部), which was later replaced by the "Ministry of Revenue and Expenditure" (度支部). At the bottom, the 10 wén Great Qing Copper Coins contained the inscription "文十錢制當" ("Worth 10 wén in standard cash coins") written from right to left indicating its nominal value.

The reverse side of the Great Qing Copper Coin, like the Guangxu Yuanbao provincial coinages, also had the design of a Chinese dragon on it, but these dragons have much fewer variations in comparison to those on the Guangxu Yuanbao milled coins because of the imperial government's efforts in standardising designs. Near the upper part of the outer rim were the Traditional Chinese characters "光緒年造" (and later "宣統年造") written from right to left, meaning "minted during the Guangxu (or Xuantong) years" (same as the meaning of the Manchu text inscribed near the upper part of the outer rim on the obverse side). Near the lower part of the outer rim was the text, written in English, "Tai-Ching-Ti-Kuo Copper Coin", where "Tai-Ching-Ti-Kuo" refers to the Qing dynasty.

=== Mint marks ===
Mint marks of the Great Qing Copper Coin
Mint mark	Province	Image
皖	Anhui	
閩	Fujian	
粵	Guangdong	
汴	Henan	
鄂	Hubei	
湘	Hunan	
甯	Jiangnan	
蘇	Jiangsu	
贛	Jiangxi	
吉	Jilin	
奉	Fengtian	
镇	Qingjiang	
東	Shandong	
川	Sichuan	
雲	Yunnan	
滇	Yunnan	
滇川	Yunnan-Sichuan	
浙	Zhejiang	
直	Zhili	

=== Years ===
Years on the Great Qing Copper Coin
Chinese calendar (Note: Written from right to left.)	Gregorian calendar
巳乙	1906
午丙	1907
未丁	1908
申戊	1909
酉己	1910
戌庚	1911

== Denominations ==
Denominations of the Great Qing Copper Coin
Denomination	Traditional Chinese	Image
1 wén	一文	
2 wén	二文	
5 wén	五文	
10 wén	十文	
20 wén	二十文	

== Contemporary counterfeit Great Qing Copper Coin ==
Not long after these new copper coins were introduced, black market counterfeit versions of the 10 wén appeared and illegal mints or "private mints" (局私) opened all over China and started producing more coins than what the Qing government's set quotas allowed on the market. Both Chinese and foreigners soon started producing struck cash coins of inferior quality, often with traces of the Korean 5 fun coins they were overstruck on, or with characters and symbols not found on official government issued coins. Joseon began minting modern-style machine-struck copper-alloy coins in 1892, which was 8 years before the Qing dynasty did so in China. These coins were often minted by Korean businessmen and former Japanese Samurai (specifically Rōnin) looking to make a profit on exchanging the low value copper coins into silver dollars as a single Chinese silver dollar had the purchasing power of 1000 Korean fun. The majority of the counterfeit coins bear the inscription that they were minted in either Zhejiang province or Shandong province, but they circulated all over the coastal regions of China. Because the hand-operated presses used by the counterfeiters did not exert enough pressure on the coins to sufficiently obliterate the inscriptions and symbols on the Korean 5 fun coins, the counterfeit Qing dynasty 10 wén coins made using this method would usually exhibit a combination of both the Chinese Great Qing Copper Coin and Korean 5 fun designs. For example, there can still be traces of a wreath surrounding the dragon or minor traces of the original Korean inscription.

== Sources ==
- Dai Zhiqiang (戴志強), ed. (2008). Zhongguo qianbi shoucang jianshang quanji (中國錢幣收藏鑒賞全集) (Changchun: Jilin chuban jituan). (in Mandarin Chinese).
- Nei Menggu qianbi yanjiu hui (內蒙古錢幣研究會), Zhongguo qianbi bianjibu (《中國錢幣》編輯部), ed. (1992); Cai Mingxin 蔡明信 (transl.). Zhongguo guchao tuji (Beijing: Zhongguo jinrong chubanshe). (in Mandarin Chinese).
- Peng Xinwei (彭信威) (1954 [2007]). Zhongguo huobi shi (中國貨幣史) (Shanghai: Qunlian chubanshe), 580–581, 597–605. (in Mandarin Chinese).
- Xie Tianyu (謝天宇), ed. (2005). Zhongguo qianbi shoucang yu jianshang quanshu (中國錢幣收藏與鑒賞全書) (Tianjin: Tianjin guji chubanshe), Vol. 2, 508. (in Mandarin Chinese).
- Zhou Fazeng (周發增), Chen Longtao (陳隆濤), Qi Jixiang (齊吉祥), ed. (1998). Zhongguo gudai zhengzhi zhidu shi cidian (中國古代政治制度史辭典) (Beijing: Shoudu shifan daxue chubanshe), 372, 375, 380, 381, 382. (in Mandarin Chinese).
