= Jizhou Town =

Subdivision of Jizhou District, Hengshui, China

Coordinates: 37.5455°N 115.5663°E

Jizhou (冀州镇) is a town in Jizhou City, Hebei, China.
