= Chu Chun =

Chu Chun چوچون
- Village
- Location within Iran
- Coordinates: 29°23′32″N 57°49′03″E
- Country: Iran
- Province: Kerman
- County: Bam
- Bakhsh: Central
- Rural District: Howmeh

Population (2006)
  - Total: 43
- Time zone: UTC+3:30 (IRST)
  - Summer (DST): UTC+4:30 (IRDT)

Chu Chun (Persian: چوچون, also Romanized as Chū Chūn and Choochoon; also known as Chīchow and Chīchū) is a village in Howmeh Rural District, in the Central District of Bam County, Kerman Province, Iran. At the 2006 census, its population was 43, in 16 families.
