= Jeju =

Jeju may refer to:

== South Korea ==
- Jeju Island, South Korea
- Jeju Province, a province of South Korea that contains Jeju Island and other islands
  - Jeju City, its capital
  - Jeju dog, a dog native to Jeju Island
  - Jeju language
  - The Jeju people
  - Jeju Black, a cattle breed from Jeju Island
  - Jeju horse
- Jeju Air, an airline operating from Jeju Province
- Jeju Bank, a subsidiary of Shinhan Bank
- Jeju SK FC, a professional football club in South Korea

== Other uses ==
- Jeju (woreda), a district in Oromia Region, Ethiopia
- Hoplerythrinus unitaeniatus, an Amazonian fish known as jeju

== See also ==
- Jeju Shinhwa World, a South Korean resort on Jeju Island
