= Jizhou, Hengshui =

Coordinates: 37°33′N 115°35′E

Jizhou 冀州区
- District
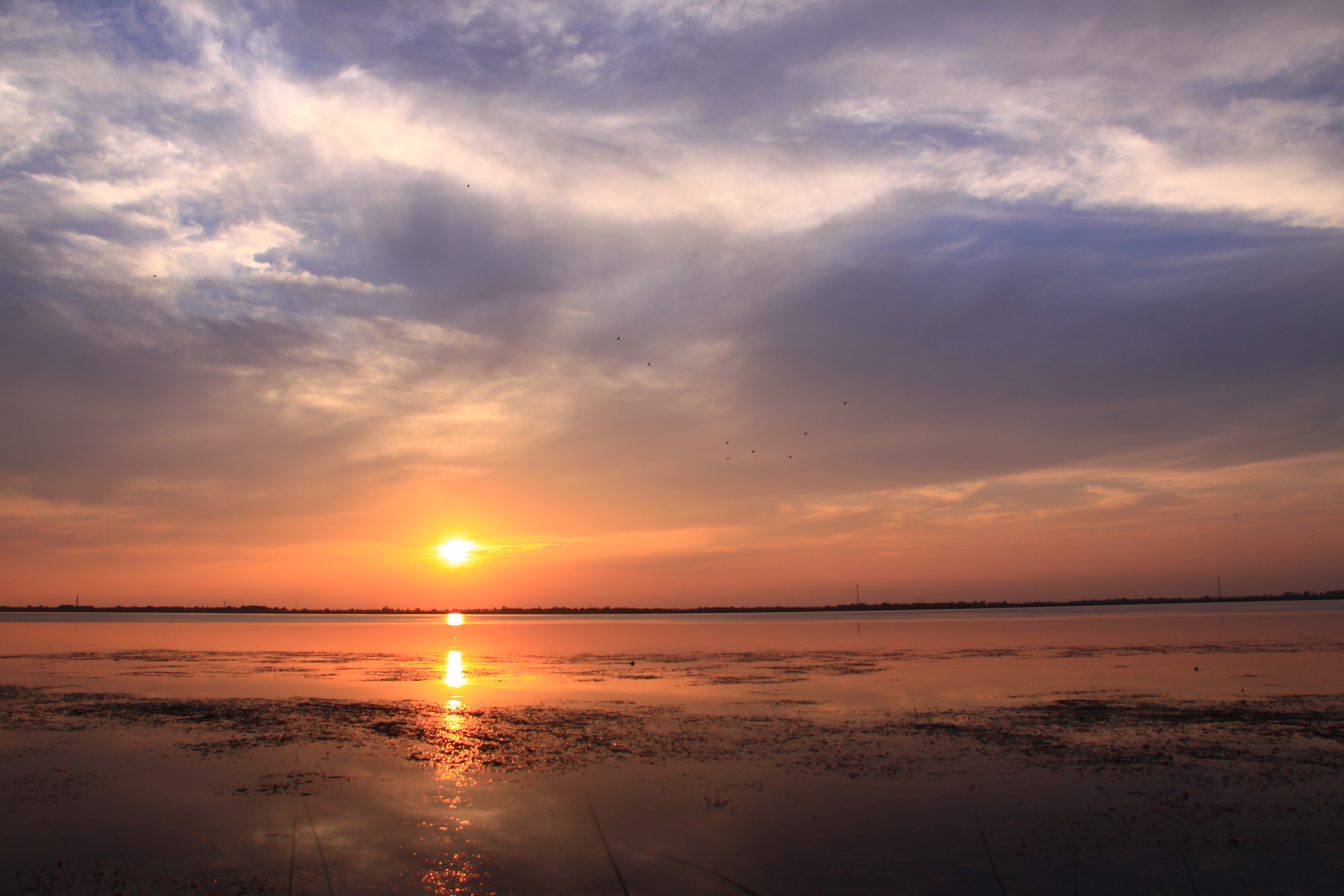

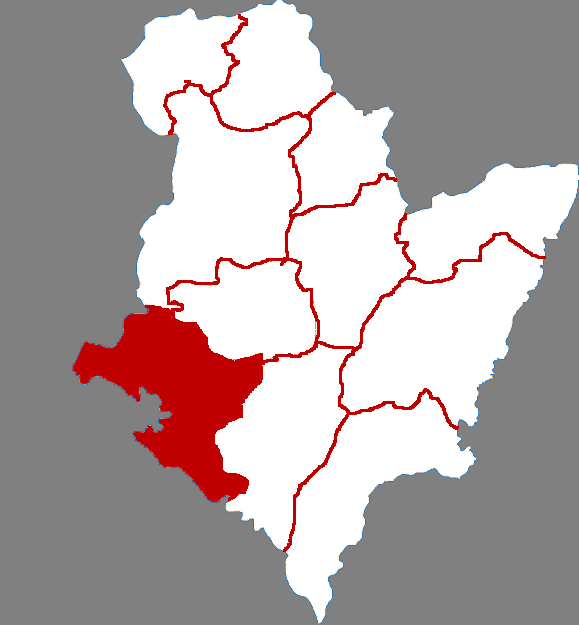
- Jizhou in Hengshui

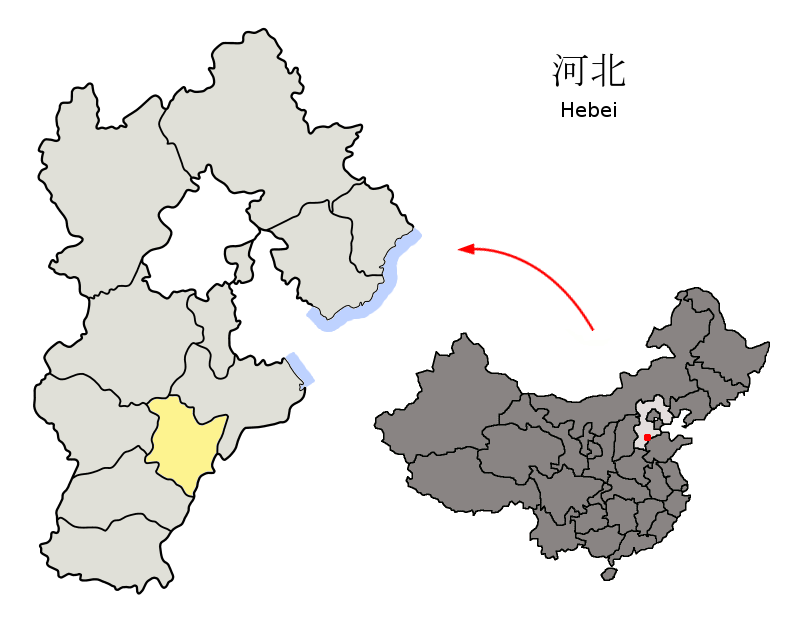
- Hengshui in Hebei
- Country: People's Republic of China
- Province: Hebei
- Prefecture-level city: Hengshui
- Time zone: UTC+8 (China Standard)
- Postal code: 053200
- Website: www.zgjz.gov.cn

Jizhou
- Chinese: 冀州
- Postal: Kichow
Transcriptions
Standard Mandarin
- Hanyu Pinyin: Jìzhōu
- Wade–Giles: Chi^{4}-chou^{1}

Alternative Chinese name
- Simplified Chinese: 冀县
- Traditional Chinese: 冀縣
Transcriptions
Standard Mandarin
- Hanyu Pinyin: Jì Xiàn

Jizhou (Chinese: 冀州), formerly Ji County (冀县), is a district in Hengshui, Hebei Province, China. It shares its name with a province of old, Jizhou or Ji Province, which covered parts of modern-day Hebei, Henan, and Shandong Provinces.

== Administrative divisions ==
Towns:

- Jizhou Town (冀州镇), Weijiatun (魏家屯镇), Guandaoli (官道李镇), Nanwucun (南午村镇), Zhoucun (周村镇), Matouli (码头李镇), Xiwangzhuang (西王庄镇)

Townships:

- Menjiazhuang Township (门家庄乡), Xujiazhuang Township (徐家庄乡), Beizhanghuai Township (北漳淮乡), Xiaozhai Township (小寨乡)

== Climate ==
Climate data for Jizhou, elevation 25 m (82 ft), (1991–2020 normals, extremes 1981–2010)
Month	Jan	Feb	Mar	Apr	May	Jun	Jul	Aug	Sep	Oct	Nov	Dec	Year
Record high °C (°F)	17.1 (62.8)	24.0 (75.2)	31.8 (89.2)	35.0 (95.0)	39.2 (102.6)	40.6 (105.1)	42.7 (108.9)	37.0 (98.6)	38.2 (100.8)	31.9 (89.4)	26.4 (79.5)	20.0 (68.0)	42.7 (108.9)
Mean daily maximum °C (°F)	3.4 (38.1)	7.7 (45.9)	14.7 (58.5)	21.7 (71.1)	27.6 (81.7)	32.5 (90.5)	32.3 (90.1)	30.6 (87.1)	27.1 (80.8)	21.1 (70.0)	12.0 (53.6)	4.9 (40.8)	19.6 (67.4)
Daily mean °C (°F)	−2.2 (28.0)	1.6 (34.9)	8.2 (46.8)	15.2 (59.4)	21.2 (70.2)	26.2 (79.2)	27.4 (81.3)	25.8 (78.4)	21.1 (70.0)	14.6 (58.3)	6.2 (43.2)	−0.4 (31.3)	13.7 (56.8)
Mean daily minimum °C (°F)	−6.6 (20.1)	−3.2 (26.2)	2.7 (36.9)	9.3 (48.7)	15.2 (59.4)	20.4 (68.7)	23.1 (73.6)	21.8 (71.2)	16.3 (61.3)	9.3 (48.7)	1.5 (34.7)	−4.4 (24.1)	8.8 (47.8)
Record low °C (°F)	−21.1 (−6.0)	−18.9 (−2.0)	−9.0 (15.8)	−2.3 (27.9)	4.9 (40.8)	10.1 (50.2)	16.7 (62.1)	13.7 (56.7)	6.0 (42.8)	−2.6 (27.3)	−15.0 (5.0)	−21.3 (−6.3)	−21.3 (−6.3)
Average precipitation mm (inches)	2.1 (0.08)	6.0 (0.24)	8.1 (0.32)	25.6 (1.01)	41.0 (1.61)	54.1 (2.13)	130.9 (5.15)	104.3 (4.11)	43.3 (1.70)	26.9 (1.06)	14.3 (0.56)	2.9 (0.11)	459.5 (18.08)
Average precipitation days (≥ 0.1 mm)	1.6	2.7	2.4	4.9	5.8	7.4	10.6	9.0	6.2	4.8	3.4	2.0	60.8
Average snowy days	2.4	2.9	0.9	0.2	0	0	0	0	0	0	1.1	2.1	9.6
Average relative humidity (%)	60	55	51	56	59	59	76	80	73	66	66	63	64
Mean monthly sunshine hours	153.6	161.8	218.0	236.5	265.9	231.9	204.5	202.9	197.2	192.5	160.5	155.3	2,380.6
Percentage possible sunshine	50	53	58	60	60	53	46	49	54	56	53	52	54
Source: China Meteorological Administration

== Culture ==
- Jibaozhai Museum
