= Cash coins in feng shui =

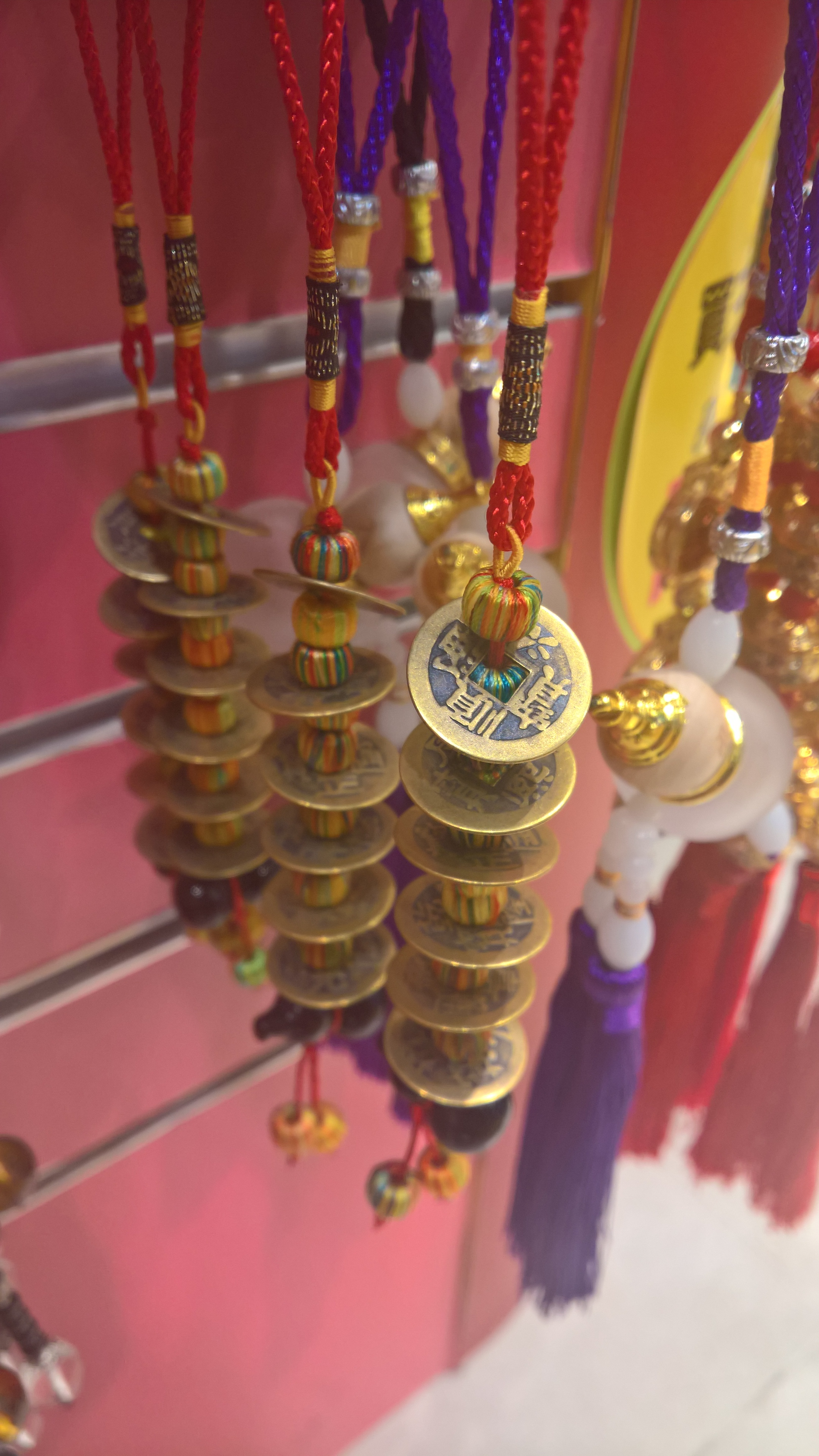
- Feng shui coins for sale at the Hong Kong International Airport, Hong Kong (2018)

Chinese name
- Traditional Chinese: 古銅錢的風水
- Simplified Chinese: 古铜钱的风水
- Literal meaning: "Old copper coin's feng shui"
Transcriptions
Standard Mandarin
- Hanyu Pinyin: Gǔ tóngqián de fēngshuǐ

Vietnamese name
- Vietnamese alphabet: Tiền xu phong thủy / Đồng xu phong thủy (Note: Alternative Vietnamese terms include Đồng tiền phong thủy (銅錢風水) and Tiền cổ phong thủy (錢古風水).)
- Hán-Nôm: 錢樞風水 / 銅樞風水

The usage of cash coins in the Chinese religious practice of feng shui is commonplace influencing many superstitions involving them. Believers in feng shui believe in a primal life force called qi (or chi) and apply their beliefs to the design of residential houses, as well as to commercial and public buildings, sometimes incorporating cash coins into the flow of this qi.

Cash coins are category of ancient Chinese coinage which are typically round in shape and have a square central hole, these coins were used as the main currency of imperial China between 221 BC and 1912 AD. In feng shui cash coins are believed to be able to attract wealth and prosperity and to ward off "evil spirits" (煞氣; shà qì). However, placing them an outward facing position is believed to cause misfortune and placing them at the wrong places supposedly attracts "evil spirits" and poverty. For this reason special care is usually taken by feng shui practitioners when handling cash coins. While classic Chinese coins can come in a huge variety, particular categories of them enjoy more celebrity status than others, this is because Feng shui practitioners believe that some cash coin inscriptions are more auspicious than others, for example the Qianlong Tongbao (乾隆通寶) is commonly seen as an auspicious inscription because it was produced in a period of military and economic ascendancy in Chinese history, while the Xuanhe Tongbao (宣和通寶) is seen as inauspicious because it was produced during a more tumultuous era.

Feng shui practitioners typically place cash coins that are strung together somewhere in their house or in a cash register to supposedly attract wealth, alternatively they may carry them around as an accessory or place them in their wallet for good luck. A common way cash coins are used in feng shui is as a set of 5 coins known as the "Five Emperor Coins" (see below), these are often used as counters to hanging beams or exposed pillars. When used for such purposes, the 5 coins are often tied together with a red string (as red is seen as an auspicious colour) so as to charge them with yang energy. When combined with Taoist beliefs cash coins could be strung in the shape of a sword to scare away evil spirits.

Because of their common association with feng shui, cash coins are commonly referred to as feng shui coins in English.

The application of cash coins in feng shui should not be confused with the use of cash coin and cash coin-like amulets as "lucky charms" outside of feng shui, their usage in traditional Chinese medicine, or their usage in traditional Chinese fortune telling.

== Chinese cash coins ==
The cash coin became the main standard currency of China in 221 BC with the Ban Liang (半兩) and would be produced until 1912 AD there with the Minguo Tongbao (民國通寶). Cash coins are characterised by their round outer shape and a square center hole (Chinese: 方穿; pinyin: fāng chuān; Jyutping: fong1 cyun1; Pe̍h-ōe-jī: hong-chhoan). The hole in the centre of the coins allowed them to be strung together.

Originally cast during the Warring States period, these coins continued to be used for the entirety of Imperial China. The last Chinese cash coins were cast in the first year of the Republic of China. Generally most cash coins were made from copper or bronze alloys, with iron, lead, and zinc coins occasionally used less often throughout Chinese history. Rare silver and gold cash coins were also produced. During most of their production, cash coins were cast, but during the late Qing dynasty, machine-struck cash coins began to be made. As the cash coins produced over Chinese history were similar, thousand year old cash coins produced during the Northern Song dynasty continued to circulate as valid currency well into the early twentieth century.

Over the years, cash coins have had many different inscriptions, and the Wu Zhu (五銖) inscription, which first appeared under the Han dynasty, became the most commonly used inscription and was often used by succeeding dynasties for 700 years until the introduction of the Kaiyuan Tongbao (開元通寳) during the Tang dynasty. This was also the first time regular script was used as all earlier cash coins exclusively used seal script. During the Song dynasty a large number of different inscriptions was used, and several different styles of Chinese calligraphy were used, even on coins with the same inscriptions produced during the same period. These cash coins are known as matched coins (對錢). This was originally pioneered by the Southern Tang. During the Yuan dynasty, largely deprecated copper coinage was abandoned in favour of paper money. This trend continued under the Ming dynasty. Cash coins only contained the era names of the emperor during the Ming dynasty. Due to a naming taboo the term "Yuanbao" (元寶) was phased out from cash coin inscriptions as the founder of the Ming dynasty, Zhu Yuanzhang had the word "Yuan" (元) in his name. The trend of exclusively using the era names on currencies continued during the Qing dynasty, and all cash coins issued during this period were written in regular script.

Outside of China, Chinese cash coins have inspired the design of the Japanese mon, Korean mun, Ryukyuan mon, and Vietnamese văn currencies and the last series of cash coins produced in the world were the French Indochinese Bảo Đại Thông Bảo (保大通寶) during the 1940s.

== Significance of cash coins in feng shui ==
Chinese people in the past believed that "similar things come together" and in this principle they believed that objects and events of the same nature will gather together: flowers go with flowers, grass goes with grass, gold goes with gold, like-minded people gather together, Etc. Therefore, they believed that hanging coins in the house will attract more money to their household or their village.

Feng shui masters (traditional Chinese: 風水師; simplified Chinese: 风水师; pinyin: Fēngshuǐ shī) recommend the use of old Chinese cash coins to enhance the feng shui of a house (for the usage of old Chinese charms in the house, see "Chinese house charms"). In feng shui certain cash coins are thought to be able to provide protection and promote good fortune. Generally speaking, Feng shui masters always have a large number of Chinese copper-alloy cash coins on hand. This is because cash coins, as well as jade, are the basic tools used to adjust the yin and yang forces of a house. The reasons why cash coins have an important role in feng shui are numerous and concerns the very nature of Chinese cash coins as they have always been a potent instrument in feng shui.

The reasons why Chinese cash coins have an important place in feng shui include:

- 1. The Chinese cash coin is a (historical) type of currency and therefore represents good fortune, wealth, and prosperity.
- 2. A pair of Chinese cash coins (双钱; 雙錢; Shuāngqián) is one of the "Eight Treasures", also known as the Eight Precious Things.
- 3. Money is a homophonic pun for "right before your eyes", this is because the word "money" (錢,; qián) sounds like the word for front (前; qián), and the square in the coin was sometimes referenced as "the eye of the coin".
- 4. Chinese cash coins reflect ancient Chinese philosophy concerning the relationship of the heavens, earth, and man. This is because in cash coins are commonly believed that the round shape of the coin symbolised the supposed round shape of the sky (天; tiān), while the centre hole in this analogy is said to represent the planet earth (地; dì), known as Tiān yuán dì fāng (天圓地方). Furthermore, it is also common for cash coins to have the name of the reigning emperor, who in ancient Chinese philosophy was the representative of man (人; rén) on earth, inscribed into them in the area between the round rim and the square central hole. Therefore, old Chinese cash coins display the proper relationship of the heavens (circle – rim) and earth (square – hole) with man (emperor – inscription) standing in between (「天、地、人」), giving them great power in feng shui. This means that the "powers" contained in these types of coins are not just due to them originating from the historical emperors, but also because these emperors have had them designed according to Chinese metaphysics.
- 5. Coins are metallic objects and are therefore one of the wuxing (五行) in Chinese philosophy element of metal (金). As Old Chinese cash coins are typically made of copper alloys they are seen as being better able to absorb aura than either gold or silver. Though in feng shui it is also believed that metal objects can have evil spirits within them. (Note: For example, there is a classical superstition that if a person is suffering from severe nightmares, they should place a kitchen knife or a pair of scissors under their pillow while sleeping to stop the nightmares, however, because the metal object is placed so close to the person's head the object is thought harm a person's soul to no small measure, which is why it only applied to severe nightmares. For this reason metal objects, including coins, tend to be handled with care and reservation in feng shui.) Because of their association with the metal element they can vent the rusticity of two blacks and five yellows (二黑及五黃之土氣; Èr hēi jí wǔ huáng zhī tǔqì).
- 6. Throughout Chinese history many of these cash coins may have been used for feng shui purposes in the past, meaning that they would have been buried according to practices of feng shui in places that were considered to be the best areas where the forces of wind, water, and earth were at their strongest.
- 7. Chinese cash coins which were cast during periods when the Chinese Empire was strong are considered to carry both the message of "prosperity and development" (興旺發達; 兴旺发达; Xīngwàng fādá) and the message of "suppression of evils" (鎮壓百邪; 镇压百邪; Zhèn yā bǎi xié).
- 8. Chinese cash coins are considered to have absorbed and concentrated the power of millions of people into small objects because they circulated as money for hundreds of years. Meaning that the often switched hands and allowed for the energy of the owners to rub off on the coins.

Cash coins when used for feng shui purposes can be combined with other feng shui items to enhance their usage. For example, if they are added to a Pixiu, it can strengthen the wealth effect of the Pixiu statuette, and if you add it to Qilin, it can also increase the power of eliminating evil spirits of the Qilin statuette. Other examples include gourds, where they supposedly strengthen its healing functions and countering evil spirits (sha qì), mystic knots for protection, and crystals for wealth.

While feng shui coins are typically made from copper alloys, they can also be made from stone, jade, other metals, Etc.

== Cash coins considered to be suitable and unsuitable for feng shui ==
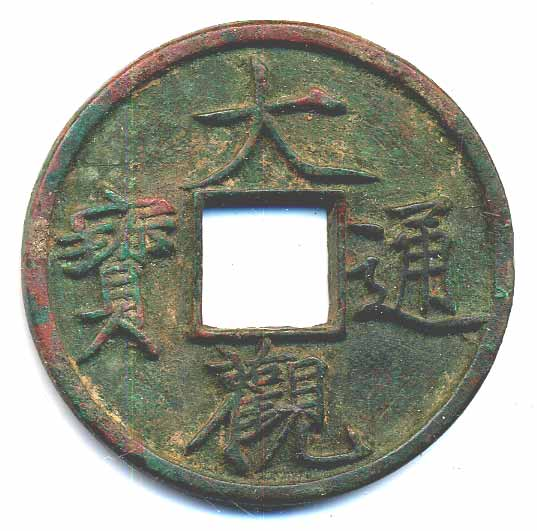
A Northern Song dynasty period Daguan Tongbao (大觀通寶) is an example of an "auspicious cash coin" in feng shui because it was produced during an era of national strength and prosperity.

Some cash coins considered to be suitable and others unsuitable for feng shui to provide protection from evil and the promotion of good fortune, on this Chinese Feng shui masters note that the supposed "effectiveness" of a cash coin is dependent on the coin's alloy and quality, how many people have previously used it, and the time period when the cash coin was produced.

Factors typically considered by Feng shui masters include:

- 1. The metal content and quality of a cash coin is often seen as the first consideration, this is because historical Chinese cash coins were not purely made from copper but were typically made from copper alloys. In feng shui it is believed that metal objects themselves can be possessed by evil spirits diminishing their supposed "effectiveness" in the practice to suppress ghosts.
- 2. The number of people who have used it in the past is also important in feng shui as it is seen as positive qi (陽氣), qi being the primal life force found in people, objects, places, Etc., with a higher number of people having handled it being generally seen as better. Despite this, some practitioners of feng shui believe that the positive qi could have been "contaminated" and lowering its effectiveness in warding off evil. While coin collectors and coin dealers value the physical appearance of a coin Feng shui masters claim that for the purposes of feng shui this makes no difference and they claim that they are able to mitigate the contaminated qi.
- 3. Where the cash coin was purchased is also seen as an important factor as there are many, many fake coins (including fake cash coins) available for purchase in the antique markets of major cities throughout China and for feng shui purposes a cash coin needs to be authentic. For this reason Feng shui masters advise people to only purchase cash coins from a coin dealer that they personally know and feel that they can trust. Furthermore, they recommend that cash coins which have a history of being used for feng shui are better as they are very likely to have been dealt with by a Feng shui master at some point in the past and are more recommended to be purchased. Another factor in purchasing cash coins recommended by Feng shui masters is the visible wear on the coin as this would indicate that the cash coin in question has enjoyed long circulation meaning that it has accumulated more positive qi, this also differentiates them from buried coins (which are seen as inauspicious in feng shui) as cash coins that have been buried for centuries typically have a heavily encrusted patina. Taoists believe that placing a cash coin next to cinnabar money (硃砂銅錢; 朱砂铜钱; Zhūshā tóngqián) would help mitigate the issues if a cash coin is seen as being questionable to be used for feng shui purposes. Cinnabar rust money refers to old cash coins which had oxidated in an alkaline environment (PH7-10) and appeared red in colour, this is because the soil reduced substances such as organic sugars to produce cuprous oxide (Cu_{2}O) which is dark red, and also lead red (Pb_{3}O_{4}). This occurs when local corrosion and electrochemical corrosion will also occur, producing red and green rust forming small pinholes (referred to as "bone rust"). Cash coins typically first rust green before they turn red into cinnabar rust money. This is because cash coins until the mid-Ming dynasty period onwards most cash coins were made from bronze, though later cash coins were mostly made from brass causing them to oxidise differently, but because the old superstitions still applied people would manually apply cinnabar dye to make them appear red, which is known as cinnabar money or old cinnabar happy money. Though as feng shui practitioners note that the "magic" behind cash coins are the in the design, it is believed that while they are weaker in prowess compared to genuine Chinese cash coins, replicas will nevertheless contain the same metaphysical make-up.
- 4. Another factor that plays a part in the usage of cash coins in feng shui is the period when an individual coin was produced, this is because Feng shui masters claim that if a cash coin was produced during periods when China was a strong military power and had a rising economy the coin would contain a certain quantity of positive qi, but cash coins produced during times of tremendous turmoil and when the Chinese Empire suffered a serious decline are seen as negative. This means that some of the most desired cash coins for feng shui purposes are the Kangxi Tongbao (康熙通寶), which were produced during the reign of the Kangxi Emperor which lasted 61 years, meaning that his reign lasted an entire sexagenary cycle symbolising "longevity" and the fact that the Qing dynasty was experiencing a period of stability, had frequent military successes, and enjoyed economic prosperity during his reign. Likewise, Song dynasty coinage is often considered auspicious for similar reasons, in particular those produced during times of prosperity like the Northern Song period Daguan Tongbao (大觀通寶), while those produced during periods of decline like the Xuanhe Tongbao (宣和通寶) are considered to be unfit for feng shui purposes.

=== Five Emperor Coins ===
In feng shui, the term Five Emperor Coins (五帝錢 / 五帝幣; 五帝钱 / 五帝币; Wǔdì qián / Wǔdì bì; Vietnamese: Tiền ngũ đế / Tiền năm vua), also sometimes called "Five Emperor Money Coins" in English, refers to a set of cash coins that were produced during the early and High Qing eras when the Qing dynasty was at its height both militarily and economically. This set includes authentic cash coins produced during the reigns of the Shunzhi, Kangxi, Yongzheng, Qianlong, and Jiaqing Emperors. As this period was when China's national power was the strongest, the authority of the emperor dominated, and Chinese society enjoyed stability the Five Emperor Coins are seen as having the essence of "heaven, earth, and people" (天、地、人). In this context it is sometimes referred to as "genius, genius, talent" (天才，地才，人才). Five Emperor Coins are also used with Tai Sui practices.

The five emperors reigned from 1644 to 1824, which happened to be a cycle in feng shui (as a cycle occurs every 180 years). The Shunzhi reign period belongs to northern water (北方水), Kangxi belongs to eastern wood (東方木), Yongzheng belongs to central earth (中央土), Qianlong belongs to western metal (西方金), and Jiaqing belongs to southern fire (南方火), which is exactly the symbol of the five elements of metal, wood, water, fire, and earth.

Feng shui masters typically advise people to select cash coins for feng shui purposes that are approximately the same size and thickness as each other. During the 60-year-long reign of the Qianlong Emperor a large quantity of Qianlong Tongbao cash coins were produced in varying sizes and qualities, this means that when selecting cash coins with this inscription special attention has to be given.

The Five Emperor Coins consist of:

Five Emperor Coins (五帝錢)
Inscription (Traditional Chinese)	Translation of the era name	Reign period	Note(s)	Image
Shunzhi Tongbao (順治通寶)	"To rule smoothly".	1644–1661	In feng shui this cash coin symbolises change, new beginnings, and origins.	
Kangxi Tongbao (康熙通寶)	"Healthy and prosperous".	1662–1722	In feng shui this cash coin signifies wealth, prosperity, and good fortune.	
Yongzheng Tongbao (雍正通寶)	"Harmony and upright".	1723–1735	In feng shui this cash coin represents strength, willpower, and influence.	
Qianlong Tongbao (乾隆通寶)	"Lasting eminence".	1736–1795	The term "Qianlong" is a homophonic pun with the word "coin dragon" (錢龍, qián lóng) making it an especially auspicious inscription for attracting wealth. In feng shui this cash coin epitomises wisdom, stability, and intelligence.	
Jiaqing Tongbao (嘉慶通寶)	"Good and celebrate".	1796–1820	In feng shui this cash coin embodies hard work, conviction, and decisiveness.	

Alternative set of Five Emperor Coins:

Inscription (Traditional Chinese)	Emperor (Traditional Chinese)	Dynasty	Note(s)	Image
Ban Liang (半兩)	Qin Shi Huang (秦始皇)	Qin dynasty		
Wu Zhu (五銖)	Wu of Han (漢武帝)	Han dynasty		
Kaiyuan Tongbao (開元通寳)	Taizong of Tang (唐太宗)	Tang dynasty		
Songyuan Tongbao (宋元通寳)	Taizu of Song (宋太祖)	Song dynasty		
Yongle Tongbao (永樂通寳)	Yongle Emperor (永樂帝)	Ming dynasty		

In feng shui before being used Five Emperor Coins, like other feng shui items, have to be consecrated by a Feng shui master for them to have a feng shui effect. Consecration of Five Emperor Coins usually takes place from 7:00 to 9:00 in the morning "when the dragon raises its head", after consecration, the Five Emperor Coins should not be touched by outsiders. If the cash coins are dirty, they are either replaced or wiped with a little salt water, after drying, they are usually placed in the ground the next morning. If the consecrated Five Emperor Coins need to be replaced they are usually wrapped in red cloth and put at the temple incense candle recycling place or at crossroads to supposedly let its aura dissipate.

To attract wealth, Five Emperor Coins cash coins are usually placed placed in the area of the house where wealth is kept or generated such as the living room, work room (for those who work from home), altars, vaults or a safe, Etc. where they are usually strung together in a particular order. Sometimes they are also placed inside of a car.

==== Other variations ====
- Three Emperor Coins (三帝钱; 三帝錢 3 đồng xu may mắn) is a set of cash coins consisting of the Qianlong Tongbao, Jiaqing Tongbao, and the Daoguang Tongbao. The Three Emperor Coins set has become popular because the emperors in this set sound like "Money gets home" (錢到家; 钱到家; Qián dàojiā) which indicates prosperity and the avoidance of evil. Furthermore, during the reigns of the Qianlong, Jiaqing, and Daoguang Emperors the Qing dynasty experienced its most prosperous and stable period. "Qian Daojia" has the spirit of the three talents of heaven, earth, and people (天、地、人), plus the emperor's prestige of the three emperors, so it is thought by feng shui practitioners that it can attract wealth, prosper wealth, and have the additional effect of dispelling evil spirits and protecting the body.
- Four Emperor Coins (四帝钱; 四帝錢) is a set of Shunzhi Tongbao, Kangxi Tongbao, Yongzheng Tongbao, and Qianlong Tongbao cash coins. This set is relatively rarely used.
- Six Emperor Coins (六帝钱; 六帝錢) refers to a set of cash coins consisting or the Shunzhi Tongbao, Kangxi Tongbao, Yongzheng Tongbao, Qianlong Tongbao, Jiaqing Tongbao, and the Daoguang Tongbao. This set of cash coins is typically used in a similar method as the Five Emperor Coins set, but is different in the fact that it is not only used in ordinary feng shui but also in specialised wicket 5 yellows and 2 blacks functions, commonly known as the "Liubaigan" (六白乾). The five yellows and the two black evil spirits are both prosperous in the soil, and the evil spirits are dispelled by the earth-generated metal (feng shui should be vented rather than fighting). Qianlong Tongbao cash coins are seen as "the most suitable feng shui tool" of the set. While the Six Emperor Coins are seen as more useful in resolving the five yellows, this set is seen as less useful than the Five Emperor Coins for a number of other feng shui functions. Furthermore, for a set of 6 cash coins the requirements are more relaxed and authentic old coins are not seen as a necessity as they are with the five emperors set as modern replicas are seen as suitable for this set. In fact, a 6 coin set made up entirely of Qianlong Tongbao cash coins with the same thickness and basically the same size are seen as a suitable alternative.
- Seven Emperor Coins (七帝钱; 七帝錢) refers to a set of cash coins consisting or the Shunzhi Tongbao, Kangxi Tongbao, Yongzheng Tongbao, Qianlong Tongbao, Jiaqing Tongbao, Daoguang Tongbao, and a Xianfeng inscription. The Seven Emperor Coins are typically woven into the shape of plum blossoms and consecrated. Feng shui practitioners claim that this set can dispel evil spirits, strengthen the owner's self-confidence, and resolve the defects of the six gods without a master (六神無主, Liù shén wú zhǔ). (Note: "Six gods without a master" is a Mandarin Chinese term referring to someone being in a state of utter stupefaction, Taoists believe that the human heart, lungs, liver, kidneys, spleen, and gallbladder are each dominated by gods, known as the six gods (六神; Liù shén). When someone is in a state or panic these six gods are said to be "without a master" (無主; Wú zhǔ). The term is used to described someone suffering from panic, being anxious, out of ideas, and not knowing what to do.) The Seven Emperor Coins are commonly placed in cash registers or inside of left drawers of an office to help gather wealth and increase income. In the home, it is placed in the left drawer of the bedroom cabinet to attract wealth.
- Eight Emperor Coins (八帝钱; 八帝錢) refers to a set of cash coins consisting or the Shunzhi Tongbao, Kangxi Tongbao, Yongzheng Tongbao, Qianlong Tongbao, Jiaqing Tongbao, Daoguang Tongbao, Xianfeng Tongbao / Xianfeng Zhongbao / Xianfeng Yuanbao, and Tongzhi Tongbao / Tongzhi Zhongbao. Consecrated Eight Emperor Coins are typically placed in a pendant for attracting wealth, guarding houses, avoiding evil spirits, dispelling evil spirits, preventing gossip, and driving safely. The main function of the Eight Emperor Coins in feng shui is to gain job promotions. Feng shui practitioners typically place this set on the back of an office chair or against the back of a wall to prevent adversaries from slandering them behind their backs.
- Nine Emperor Coins (九帝钱; 九帝錢) refers to a set of cash coins consisting or the Shunzhi Tongbao, Kangxi Tongbao, Yongzheng Tongbao, Qianlong Tongbao, Jiaqing Tongbao, Daoguang Tongbao, Xianfeng Tongbao / Xianfeng Zhongbao / Xianfeng Yuanbao, Tongzhi Tongbao / Tongzhi Zhongbao, and Guangxu Tongbao / Guangxu Zhongbao. It is mainly used to resolve all kinds of evil spirits. The "nine" number of Nine Emperor Coins belongs to "fire" element in feng shui, which can be used to relieve the air of wood. This set of cash coins is also seen to be beneficial for marriages. In addition, "nine" is the number of supreme authority, combining nine consecutive copper-alloy cash coins in feng shui have the effect of promoting government fortune and helping authority. Both authentic ancient cash coins and modern replicas are seen as acceptable for this set, depending on the method of its usage and the purpose of the set.
- Ten Emperor Coins (十帝钱; 十帝錢) refers to a set of cash coins consisting or the Shunzhi Tongbao, Kangxi Tongbao, Yongzheng Tongbao, Qianlong Tongbao, Jiaqing Tongbao, Daoguang Tongbao, Xianfeng Tongbao / Xianfeng Zhongbao / Xianfeng Yuanbao, Tongzhi Tongbao / Tongzhi Zhongbao, Guangxu Tongbao / Guangxu Zhongbao, and Xuantong Tongbao. The copper-alloy cash coins of the ten emperors' reign eras are used in feng shui to block evil spirits, ward off evil spirits, invite prosperity, wealth, and auspicious luck.

== Wearing of cash coins as feng shui accessories ==
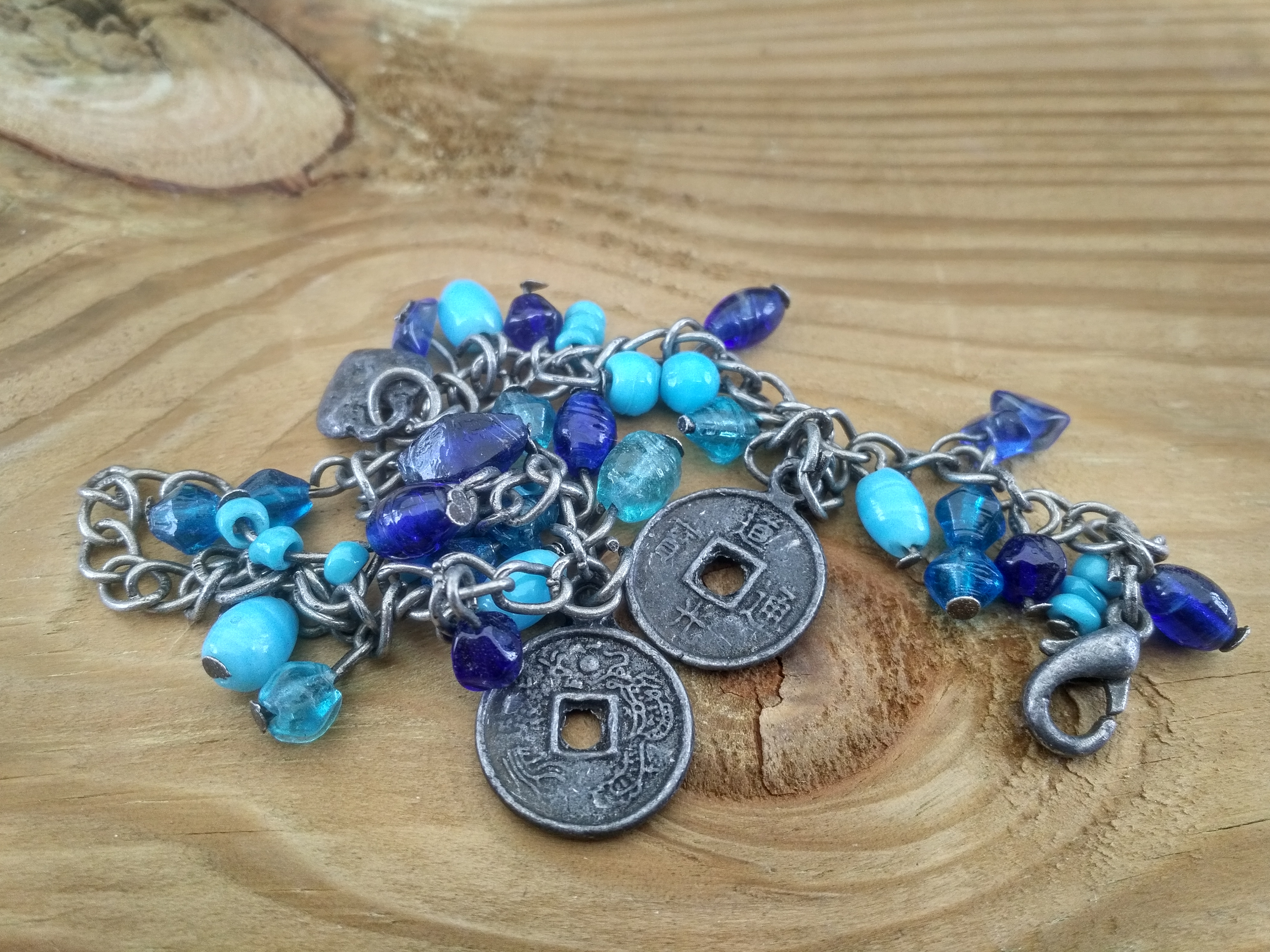
Bracelets with replica Daoguang Tongbao (道光通寶) cash coins integrated into them for sale at a market in Winschoten, Groningen, the Netherlands (2018)

Cash coins can also be worn for feng shui purposes as their square central holes conveniently allows them to be strung to a red cord, ribbon or a piece of clothing or to be worn as a necklace. Cash coins are typically strung while using it in this manner using red cords due to red being considered an auspicious colour in Chinese culture. According to the teaching of feng shui wearing cash coins can provide "personal protection from ghosts and other evils". Alternative, cash coins do not necessarily have to be worn on the body of the person but could be placed in any number of accessoires for their supposed "effect" in feng shui as they could be placed in a purse, handbag or hung on the shoulder strap of a handbag. Placing a set of Five Emperor Coins inside of a wallet is believed to attract wealth.

According to Feng shui masters, cash coin necklaces should be worn in a slip knot, which is known in Mandarin as a Huójié (活結), because slip knots can easily be released by only pulling on one cord meaning that a cash coin is able to automatically" fall off as they believe that in the presence of a nearby powerful evil force should "suddenly fall" meaning that the necklace functions as a "very good warning system" that can warn its wearer to leave immediately if such a fall occurs.

== Placement of cash coins in the home for feng shui purposes ==
According feng shui cash coins placed at inside of the home can ward off evil spirits, this is because it is believed that evil spirits typically attempt to enter a house through gates, doors, and windows and Feng shui masters claim that by placing feng shui coins close to where it is believed evil spirits will enter they will be unable to rush inside. Furthermore, in feng shui cash coins fulfill the purpose of promoting harmony in the household, and attracting both wealth and good fortune. Placing cash coins in an area associated with money such as a vault or a cash register is believed to attract more wealth (see also: Vault protector coin).

When new houses are constructed five sets of Qing dynasty Five Emperor Coins are sometimes placed at specific locations to attract both wealth and prosperity. These sets of Five Emperor Coins are placed at the four corners and the centre of the house in a specific sequence and because the interior area is usually relatively large, it is believed that Five Emperor Coins cannot be used in the interior because their supposed power is not enough for such a large area. All five sets of Five Emperor Coins are placed facing the gate, with five Shunzhi Tongbao in the left corner, five Kangxi Tongbao in the right corner, five Yongzheng Tongbao are placed in the centre, five Qianlong Tongbao are placed in the rear left corner, and five Jiaqing Tongbao in the rear right corner.

Traditionally, "protection" was usually achieved by burying feng shui coins under the threshold of the house, but as many modern people live in apartment buildings "burying" cash coins has become less convenient it has now become more commonplace to hide them under a doormat or to hang the cash coins on a door handle. When using Five Emperor Coins these are usually chronologically arranged. Sometimes cash coins are also placed underneath rugs or floor mats to strengthen the presence of "earth" energy when the level below is empty space such as a vehicle parking lot.

When placed on the right side of an entrance gate, Five Emperor Coins hung from a yellow cord are believed to help prevent female family members from being too argumentative or quarrelsome. In Chinese culture, the colour yellow is associated with the legendary Yellow Emperor and in feng shui yellow is perceived a potent symbol of both imperial rule and general authority.

When placed at the gate of the house, in feng shui Five Emperor Coins are to be placed chronologically from right-to-left. At the same time, it is required that the feet of the ancient coins face inward and the obverse of the coin face upwards. In feng shui it is believed that if the foot of the characters is turned outward that it would cause depression to the inhabitants of the household.

Placing two copper-alloy cash coins under a pillow is believed to ensure harmony in a marriage.

In traditional Chinese homes the ridgepole is the main cross beam located at the top of the house which provides major support for the roof, typically these ridgepoles are painted red because it is seen as an auspicious colour in Chinese culture and a Bagua charm (a type of cash coin amulet), sometimes including the yin and yang symbol, is usually hung from the ridgepole. This is typically done by drilling two holes at the top and bottom of the amulet. Alongside the cash coin amulet ted paper and cloth banners are hung from the ridgepole during its hoisting. These banners have such auspicious sayings as Fú xīng gāo zhào (福星高照; "Let the five good fortunes shine brightly"), Jiāng tài gōng zài cǐ (姜太公在此; "The Protector Jiang Taigong is here"), Fènghuáng zài cǐ (鳳凰在此; "The male and female phoenix are both here"), and Zǐ wēi gāo zhào (紫微高照; "Let the purple polar star shine brightly"). Besides being attached to the ridgepole during the construction of a house, an Eight Trigram cash coin amulet is frequently placed on a main gate or door, these may have inscriptions on them to ward off demons such as Zhǎn zhì xié guǐ (斬治邪鬼; "behead and punish the demons").

It is also customary in feng shui during the 5th day of the 5th month (Duanwu) to hang a five poisons charm on a door or gate as a form of protection. This is done because a host of dangerous pests such as snakes, scorpions, spiders, and others tend to become more common during the summer. The leaves of a Acorus calamus plant, which resemble a sword, are sometimes hung on the same location for the same intended effect.

To ensure and promote "good fortune" for the family Chinese people traditionally nailed cash coin amulets with auspicious inscriptions, such as Changming Fugui (長命富貴; "Longevity, wealth, and honour") and Fushou Tongtian (福壽同天; "good fortune and longevity on the same day") on a gate or wall. Sometimes these good luck amulets feature obverse sides that have inscriptions identical to cash coins, such as Qianlong Tongbao (乾隆通寳), but may be significantly larger in size, for example a Qianlong Tongbao charm being 38 millimeters in diameter and having a weight of 10.6 grams.

One of the most popular "good luck" motifs found in old Chinese houses consists of five bats (五蝠) surrounding the Chinese character for "longevity" (壽). A specific type of cash coin amulet, known as an open-work charm, with this design is known as a Wufu Pengshou (五福捧壽; "five fortunes surround longevity") and is commonly hung on a door or gate to wish for blessings and a long life.

=== Coin-swords in the home ===
In feng shui, coin-swords are often hung to frighten away demons and evil spirits. Coin-swords are a type of Chinese numismatic charm that are primarily used in southern China. The supposed powers of coin-swords do not come from the associated wealth symbolism that usually comes with cash coins. But with the design form of the cash coins used to make the sword, as well as the dynastic origins of the cash coins that carry the Emperor's reign era title. As such, in feng shui the supposed power of the coin-swords will depend heavily on which Chinese emperor's inscription is written down on the cash coins.

They are frequently hung above the bed, on residential walls, on the front and the outside of the bridal bed-curtain, or above the windows of a building. It is believed that evil spirits would not dare molest the residents of the house where the coin-sword hangs because the sword resembles that wielded by the Taoist immortal Zhong Kui, who in Chinese mythology is famous for being a slayer of evil demons. Most Chinese coin-swords consist of Qianlong Tongbao (乾隆通寳) cash coins. Coin-swords made from Qing dynasty cash coins with the inscription Kangxi Tongbao (康熙通寶) are considered to be the most effective.

About the time of a woman's confinement after her marriage, a coin-sword is sometimes taken to be hung inside of the bridal bed-curtain, usually in a position that is parallel to the horizon.

== Other feng shui uses of cash coins ==
- Cash coins are often pasted on calculators to represent having profits to count.
- Cash coins are commonly used as an ingredient for the preparation of a feng shui wealth vase (traditional Chinese: 聚寶盆; simplified Chinese: 聚宝盆; pinyin: Jùbǎopén).
- Cash coins are commonly found placed in water features or at the bottom of fish ponds, this is done to increase the wealth energy that the element of "water" supposedly brings to a household.

== Usages of cash coins that supposedly attracts evil ==
=== Categories of cash coins seen as unsuitable for feng shui purposes ===
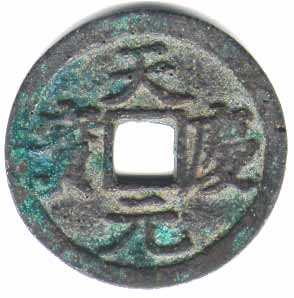
A Tianqing Yuanbao (天慶元寶) cash coin produced by the Tangut-led Western Xia dynasty is seen as "inauspicious" for feng shui purposes because the Western Xia was not recognised as a legitimate regime.

In feng shui certain cash coins are seen as being inauspicious and are discouraged by Feng shui masters because, according to them, rather than acting as a deterrent to evil they might attract it.

Factors typically seen as indicating an inauspicious cash coins by Feng shui masters include:

- 1. Cash coins that have been extracted from burial sites such as tombs and graves. It is estimated that among the "real" (authentic) cash coins that are sold in antique markets in major Chinese cities about 30% of them were recovered through excavating graves. Professional antique dealers refer to cash coins that were dug up from graves as "lao keng goods" (老坑的貨; 老坑的货; Lǎo kēng de huò). The Mandarin-language term "Lao keng" (老坑) refers to a cemetery and cash coins obtained in this way are often described as coming "from the pits". Between the years 2018 and 2021 a large number of old and valuable Chinese cash coins have entered Chinese antique markets, while fake cash coins still greatly outnumber the real cash coins at these markets, the reason for this appearance of previously rarely seen cash coins at these markets is the fact that many ancient tombs throughout China have had to be excavated to allow for construction of many highways and high-speed railway networks across the country. Feng shui masters claim that inexperienced people should not go to acquire cash coins through this method as it is not easy to determine if the coin in question was previously buried or not. For the reason that there is a large risk that an authentic cash coin purchased through traditional coin dealerships and antique sellers Feng shui masters recommend that the most reliable way to purchase a cash coin to be used for feng shui purposes is through buying them from a reputable Feng shui master. This is because they claim that "a qualified Feng shui master can determine the good and evil forces in the coins". Formerly buried cash coins are said to be full of "negative qì" (陰氣) as the places they were buried were mostly places where the wind and energy were gathered and the aura field was strong. This is a reason why feng shui practitioners claim that cash coins need to be consecrated before they can be used.
- 2. Fake cash coins and replicas of ancient cash coins are also seen as being unsuitable to be used for feng shui purposes and Feng shui masters regard them as mere "lumps of copper". This is because fake cash coins are not old as these have ttpically been made in only last few years or even the last few months, meaning that fake cash coins were not manufactured during the time of the Chinese emperors and therefore do not carry any inherent legitimacy or authority that real cash coins do derived from a regime recognised by the mandate of heaven. Though fake cash coins not intended for circulation started originally being manufactured during the 19th century when foreign coin collectors started entering the country. In fact, these fake cash coins are not really type of "coin" in the traditional sense because they were not produced to be circulating currency that was used in any marketplace, and as they never circulated they never accumulated a concentration of positive qi. Many imitation Chinese coins were only made to be sold to collectors or tourists as souvenirs. Likewise, fake cash coins when freshly purchased have never been handled by Feng shui masters and therefore have no history of previously being used for feng shui purposes. Fake cash coins are massively produced at very low costs for the makers and can be made to look like any historical coin from China's ancient past. Fake cash coins are not always easily recognised by non-expert coin collectors, while some fake cash coins are easily recognisable due to the fact that many modern fakes are machine-made and look new, many producers tend to add fake patina or attempt to make them look as if they were "worn", thus making the coins look as if they are "old". Fake cash coins come in many varieties, while they are usually spotted at first glance as many are not 100% faithful reproductions. For example, they sometimes use a different spelling or style from the originals and can also be made in a different metal, such as brass. Some fake Chinese currencies also mix symbols that could not have been on the same cash coin at the time. For example Manchu symbols and the name of an emperor from the beginning of the millennium (despite the fact that only the last dynasty, the Qing, was Manchu). Among the fake cash coins, there are also many specifically made for feng shui enthusiasts, who wish to use them claiming to harmonise energies and to improve well-being, use the Chinese currency symbol to promise good fortune. Many sellers of feng shui products sell imitations which they often offer up to the buyers as genuine ancient currencies. Their appearance is often easily recognisable by their very recent, clean, and flawless appearance, sometimes even gilded with fine gold.
- 3. Cash coins which were produced by rebellions or ethnic minority regimes. This includes Liao dynasty coinage, Da Shu coinage, Western Xia coinage, Jin dynasty coinage (1115–1234), and Shengbao among others. Feng shui masters claim that the reasons why these cash coins are not suitable for feng shui purposes is because almost all cash coins from these governments are fake or modern reproductions (which are seen as "not suitable for feng shui") and that it is difficult to find authentic cash coins produced by rebellions and minority regimes in antique markets and online. Furthermore, the fact that rebel groups were not seen as legitimate and typically ended up in failure means that their currency is seen as inauspicious.
- 4. Feng shui masters typically recommend against using ancient cash coins that were not handled by many people as these are seen as "no better than just a piece of common copper", this includes ancient cash coins that only had brief periods of production and circulation and were often only used in a small area. Feng shui masters recommend against using them because, unlike cash coins that have seen wide circulation, these coins have not been able to accumulate a large amount of positive qi (like with the fake cash coins mentioned above).

=== Six Emperor Coins and Ten Emperor Coins ===
As the Five Emperor Coins are seen as auspicious because the economy of the Qing dynasty was in its ascendancy during the reigns of the 5 emperors mentioned in the inscriptions and China enjoyed a period a military strength, Qing dynasty period cash coins produced during times when the empire was gradually falling into serious dynastic decline are seen as inauspicious for feng shui purposes. Despite this a number of dealers selling feng shui coins have been promoting "Six Emperor Coins" (六帝钱; 六帝錢) and "Ten Emperor Coins" (十帝钱; 十帝錢) which include cash coins produced during the reign of the Daoguang Emperor and later when the Qing dynasty was entering its century of humiliation. For this reason, Feng shui masters advise against using "Six Emperor Coins" and "Ten Emperor Coins" coin sets.

=== Inauspicious placements of cash coins ===
In feng shui, cash coins are believed to not just attract wealth, good fortune, and harmony when placed in the house but may also attract evil spirits (sha qì) if they are placed in certain positions or at certain places.

- If cash coins are placed at residential door to stairs they may attract different types of evil spirits depending on the direction of the staircase. If the stair goes down the house, it is believed that the owner or owners will not be able to keep their wealth and that it will easy for them to lose their money. If cash coins are placed at a door that leads to stairs going up, they will form evil spirits, which are believed to affect health and will make it easy to be injured.
- Historically, at times when carpenters and masons feel they have been treated improperly or even mistreated they might have sought revenge by secretly hiding objects within the framework of the building which would bring misfortune to the family residing in it. These bad objects would be hidden somewhere in the infrastructure of the house. While these objects could include a paper drawing or a straw figurine which they believed could become a ghost which would haunt the house, a small straw man paired with a match to attract the possibility of fire destroying the building, a broken rice bowl with a pair of chopsticks which they believed would cause economic hardship, or the tail of a pig, which had the same intended effect we the aforementioned, they could also include cash coins, such as a cart with cash coins headed away from the house. Placing the cart headed away from the house implied that money would be leaving the house and they believed that positioning cash coins in such a manner would portend poverty and hardship for the residing family.
- If placed at a door to an elevator entrance, it is believed that wealth will come and go.
- If placed at a door that is immediate to the corner of the wall, commonly known in Taiwan as "flying blade evil" (飛刃煞; Fēi rèn shā), they are believed to attract bad fortune in the form of serious injuries, car accidents, and bloody disasters. However, these effects could be mitigated by using them in cooperation with a Bagua mirror or a statue of a Pixiu. Mirrors, and especially a concave or "inverting" mirrors, are often hung above a doorways in feng shui because it is believed that a ghost will flee away if it exposed and looks at its own reflection. Since a concave mirror will invert the image of the ghost, it is believed that these types of mirrors will also "overturn" any evil influences therefore mitigating the negative effects of inauspiciously placed cash coins.
- If placed at bow-shaped roads cash coins are believed to attract uneasiness and cause the loss of wealth and energy.
- When placed at arches cash coins are believed to attract peach blossoms, which is seen as not being good for marriage and family luck. These supposed effects are believed to be mitigated when used by bead curtains.
- If placed at a door leading to a toilet cash coins are believed to attract digestive disorders and urinary diseases. These supposed effects are believed to be mitigated when used by bead curtains.
- If placed at a door leading to a kitchen cash coins are believed to attract serious car accidents and other disasters. These supposed effects are believed to be mitigated when used by bead curtains.
- If placed at a door leading to another door cash coins are believed to cause the owner of the house to become the subject of gossip. These supposed effects are believed to be mitigated when used by bead curtains.
- In feng shui it is believed that putting cash coins in a drain or placing them underneath a drain will make people lose money.

== Influence ==
Due to the cultural influence of feng shui in the Greater China region ancient Chinese coinages have been adopted into the logo design of many companies in the region, which is often referred to as the "symbolic feng shui coin logo design". Logos that are based on the various concepts and forms that are found in feng shui are the most preferred visual representation used by financial institutions such as banks in the Greater China region, with ancient Chinese coins being used in particular.

For this reason, cash coins in feng shui have developed into distinctive and unique style of logo design language in the region.

== List of feng shui coin objects ==
Description	Implied or hidden meaning	Supposed effect(s)	Usages (placement)	Image
An apricot flower amulet (traditional Chinese: 梅花銅錢; simplified Chinese: 梅花铜钱; pinyin: Méihuā tóngqián; Vietnamese: Hoa mai kim tiền) (Note: The Vietnamese reading of the Hán-Nôm characters "梅花銅錢" would be Hoa mai đồng tiền, but Vietnamese phong thủy practitioners typically refer to these cash coin-like amulets as Hoa mai kim tiền (梅花金錢).) typically has 5 "petals" and a pentagonal central hole, on each of their "petals" they have a Traditional Chinese character on them typically reading "長命守富貴".	According to feng shui, apricot flowers have a place that directly affects the fortune and luck of its owner. The 5 petals of the money flower represent the five wuxing elements Metal – Wood – Water – Fire – Earth, bringing balance and harmonization of elements in the apartment.	A pair of apricot flower amulets supposedly have the ability to protect their owners against weapons, bad air in the family, alongside the ability to bring good luck to family members.	In the house of the owner, typically in pairs of two. These amulets are typically hung in the northwest, west, and north and feng shui practitioners avoid hanging them in the east, southwest, and northeast directions. These amulets can also be hung around the waist (where they would supposedly ensure a safe entry and exit from a place).	
3 coins on a red string (Vietnamese: Tiền xu Tam Tài).	The 3 cash coins represent the harmony between Heaven – Earth – Man (Thiên – Địa – Nhân).	To bring good fortune, satisfaction, and prosperity to the owner and their whole family.	They are typically hung on an ancestor altar, placed in a cash register, or put in a wallet. The obverse of the cash coins must always face up.	
A Chinese amulet surrounded by 5 bats, hung on a red string with a slip knot.	This type of feng shui coin amulet was originally created during the Qianlong period (1735–1796) and is known in Vietnamese as đồng tiền xu cổ Phúc Tinh Chiêu Tài. The five bats are a reference to the Five Blessings.	Ward off adversaries, neutralise disasters, and attract good fortune.		
A string of cash coins with a "new year's picture" below it. The lower portion has what appears to be one very large and complex Chinese character. However, these are the four Chinese characters zhao cai jin bao (招財進寶) which roughly translates as "money and treasures will be plentiful" or "attracts wealth and treasure". This design of a New Year's picture with an auspicious inscription is also commonly found on diamond-shaped red paper in Chinese homes around lunar new year.	Around the time of Chinese New Year, Chinese families will hang nianhua (年画), or "New Year's pictures", somewhere inside of their house. Most of these are pictures associated with good fortune. The picture below the cash coins is an example of a New Year's picture with an auspicious inscription. Actually, these are 4 Chinese characters that have been combined into one. The Chinese refer to this as lianzi (连字; 連字) which means linked or combined characters.	Attract wealth for the new year.	Around the house. (Note: On the outside gate or door are hung duilian (对联; 對聯) or "New Year's couplets". These are Chinese phrases written on red strips of paper and pasted vertically on each side of the front gate. In this case they may be made from metal and hung as feng shui coins. These are also known as "spring couplets" (春联; 春聯; chunlian) and "door couplets" (门联; 門聯; menlian) and these items are derived from the "peachwood charms" (桃符; taofu) that originated during the Han dynasty period.)	
A cash coin-shaped Bagua amulet (see: "Book of Changes and Bagua charms") hung on a red cord with a slip knot (Vietnamese: Tiền xu Bát Quái).	A "trigram" is a three-lined symbol. Each of the three lines can either be continuous or broken. In Chinese culture, Yin-Yang (阴阳; 陰陽) is the term for the basic polarities of the universe, such as male/female, light/dark, strong/weak, etc. and in these symbols a straight line represents yang (阳; 陽) and a broken line represents yin (阴; 陰). There are eight possible combinations of these trigrams and they are known collectively as the Eight Trigrams or the bagua (八卦).			
Round coin with a round hole in the middle.	These coins symbolise the spirit of heaven, immensity, and integrity.	These feng shui coins supposedly limit conflicts.		
A 10 petal apricot flower to attract money (Vietnamese: Đồng tiền hoa mai 10 cánh hút tiền tài) is a feng shui coin amulet that includes a large amulet with 10 Qing dynasty period cash coins surrounding it, hung on a red cord with a slip knot.			Placed the coin right behind the backrest of the chair of the phòng tiểu nhân. The desk drawer where important documents are stored. Attached via clips in files, bags when going to trade, do business.	
Five Emperor Coins with a Bagua amulet attached to it.	The Eight Trigrams and the Yin-Yang symbol symbolise harmony.	Bring harmony to owner.	At a door in a direction considered to be "suitable for the age of the owner".	

== See also ==
- Jin Chan

== Sources ==
- Kann, Eduard – The Currencies of China (1926).
- Wong, Wing-Fai (黃詠暉, 黄咏晖) – Five Emperors Coins: The Reformation of Yansheng Object as a Popular Culture in Feng Shui. CFP – 1st Symposium of the Academic Journal of Feng Shui – Oceania, Sydney, Australia, 13–14 May 2017. Sydney, NSW, Australia: Glasstree Academic Publishing (2018).
