= Tongbao =

Tongbao can refer to:

- wikt: 同胞, a Chinese term for comrade, see tongzhi (term)
- T'oung Pao a Dutch journal and the oldest international journal of sinology founded in 1890
- A type of Imperial Chinese coinage
- Kaiyuan Tongbao
- Yongle Tongbao
- Hongwu Tongbao
  - Kangxi Tongbao
  - Qianlong Tongbao
