= Five Emperors =

The Five Emperors may refer to:

- The Five Good Emperors of the Roman Empire who ruled from 96 to 180: Nerva, Trajan, Hadrian, Antoninus Pius and Marcus Aurelius
- Year of the Five Emperors, 193 CE
- The Five Emperors and Three Sovereigns, mythical rulers of ancient China
- Wufang Shangdi a set of five Chinese deities called Emperors
- Five emperor coins, a set of 5 Qing dynasty cash coins in feng shui
