= Cash coins in traditional Chinese medicine =

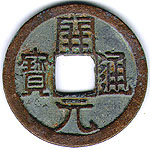
- The Kaiyuan Tongbao (開元通寳), the most desirable cash coin in traditional Chinese medicine (TCM).
- Traditional Chinese: 中國古錢幣的"藥用價值"
- Simplified Chinese: 中国古钱币的"药用价值"
- Literal meaning: "The "medicinal value" of ancient Chinese coins"
Transcriptions
Standard Mandarin
- Hanyu Pinyin: Zhōngguó gǔ qiánbì de "yào yòng jiàzhí"

The usage of cash coins in the pseudoscientific practice of traditional Chinese medicine (TCM) are primarily used in two main medical practices, notably coin rubbing (Note: Alternatively known as coining, locally known as gua sha in China, cạo gió in Vietnam, koo kchall in Cambodia, kuong in Laos, and karok in Indonesia.) and the preparation of "coin teas". Coin rubbing is practiced by ethnic Han Chinese and others in many parts of Southeast Asia and is primarily used as a treatment for "hot" diseases and is related to the more familiar (to Western people) pseudoscientific practices of cupping therapy and acupuncture.

Cash coins are category of ancient Chinese coinage which are typically round in shape and have a square central hole, these coins were used as the main currency of imperial China between 221 BC and 1912 AD. The use of cash coins in traditional medical treatments in China is well documented and has been described in medical textbooks as early as the Song dynasty period where physicians commonly used the Tang dynasty period Kaiyuan Tongbao cash coins to treat a variety of illnesses and maladies.

Cash coins are typically made of copper-alloys and contain various metals in their alloys such as tin and lead which all have medicinal applications in TCM. The uses of cash coins in TCM vary as they can be ingested, applied to wounds, used as a powder, rubbed against the body to treat supposed "hot" diseases, and made into medicinal teas. A Nature editorial described TCM as "fraught with pseudoscience", and said that the most obvious reason why it has not delivered many cures is that the majority of its treatments have no logical mechanism of action.

The application of cash coins in traditional Chinese medicine exists independently from their usage in feng shui, the use of cash coin and cash coin-like amulets as "lucky charms", or their usage in traditional Chinese fortune telling.

== Chinese cash coins ==
The cash coin became the main standard currency of China in 221 BC with the Ban Liang (半兩) and would be produced until 1912 AD there with the Minguo Tongbao (民國通寳). Cash coins are characterised by their round outer shape and a square center hole (Chinese: 方穿; pinyin: fāng chuān; Jyutping: fong1 cyun1; Pe̍h-ōe-jī: hong-chhoan). The hole in the centre of the coins allowed them to be strung together.

Originally cast during the Warring States period, these coins continued to be used for the entirety of Imperial China. The last Chinese cash coins were cast in the first year of the Republic of China. Generally most cash coins were made from copper or bronze alloys, with iron, lead, and zinc coins occasionally used less often throughout Chinese history. Rare silver and gold cash coins were also produced. During most of their production, cash coins were cast, but during the late Qing dynasty, machine-struck cash coins began to be made. As the cash coins produced over Chinese history were similar, thousand year old cash coins produced during the Northern Song dynasty continued to circulate as valid currency well into the early twentieth century.

Over the years, cash coins have had many different inscriptions, and the Wu Zhu (五銖) inscription, which first appeared under the Han dynasty, became the most commonly used inscription and was often used by succeeding dynasties for 700 years until the introduction of the Kaiyuan Tongbao (開元通寳) during the Tang dynasty. This was also the first time regular script was used as all earlier cash coins exclusively used seal script. During the Song dynasty a large number of different inscriptions was used, and several different styles of Chinese calligraphy were used, even on coins with the same inscriptions produced during the same period. These cash coins are known as matched coins (對錢). This was originally pioneered by the Southern Tang. During the Yuan dynasty, largely deprecated copper coinage was abandoned in favour of paper money. This trend continued under the Ming dynasty. Cash coins only contained the era names of the emperor during the Ming dynasty. Due to a naming taboo the term "Yuanbao" (元寶) was phased out from cash coin inscriptions as the founder of the Ming dynasty, Zhu Yuanzhang had the word "Yuan" (元) in his name. The trend of exclusively using the era names on currencies continued during the Qing dynasty, and all cash coins issued during this period were written in regular script.

Outside of China, Chinese cash coins have inspired the design of the Japanese mon, Korean mun, Ryukyuan mon, and Vietnamese văn currencies and the last series of cash coins produced in the world were the French Indochinese Bảo Đại Thông Bảo (保大通寶) during the 1940s.

== Chinese cash coins as medicine ==
According to a number of ancient books on traditional Chinese medicine, such as the Ming dynasty period authoritative work the Compendium of Materia Medica the usage of old Chinese cash coins made of a variety of copper-alloys could be used in a variety of medicines, such as those to treat abdominal pain, menstruation, heart and stomach pain, insect bites, bladder diseases, bleeding, corneal opacity, ulcers, fever, birth complications, among other ailments. Generally speaking any ancient Chinese cash coin could be used, but ancient Chinese doctors would favour specific cash coins over others for specific uses. They are typically grounded into a powder before usage.

While some recipes only took one or a handful of cash coins, others required hundreds of cash coins to supposedly be effective.

During the Northern Song dynasty period the Materia medica (本草衍義) stated that only the Qin dynasty period Ban Liang (半兩), the Han dynasty period Wu Zhu (五銖), the Xin dynasty period Da Quan Wu Shi (大泉五十), the Eastern Wu period Da Quan Wu Bai (大泉五百) and Da Quan Dang Qian (大泉當千), the Liu Song dynasty period Si Zhu (四銖), the Liang dynasty period Wu Zhu (五銖), and the Northern Qi dynasty period Chang Ping Wu Zhu (常平五銖) are the only cash coins suitable for medicinal uses.

The use of any particular cash coins by traditional Chinese medicine doctors during the later periods of dynastic China was deemed acceptable, though it was typically recommended that a cash coin should "at least 500 years old" be considered "fit for use" in the procedures of traditional Chinese medicine.

The possible origin of the usage of Chinese cash coins in traditional Chinese medicine may be due to the fact that the cash coins produced by the Han, Tang, Song, Ming, and Qing dynasties were manufactured mainly using copper, tin, iron, lead, and zinc along with the trace elements of barium, calcium, silver, and gold. Numismatic researcher Gary Ashkenazy on his Primaltrek website claims that the presence of all these elements and minerals in cash coins could have "potentially provided the necessary quantities, to cure or improve the health of those deficient in these necessary minerals". While zinc was already used in medicine in pre-modern China, over the course of Chinese history the zinc content in cash coins steadily increased.

Cash coins were also believed to have cosmetic application, such as fighting bad body odour originating from one's armpits.

=== Kaiyuan Tongbao ===
The Kaiyuan Tongbao (開元通寳) is generally favoured among practitioners of traditional Chinese medicine, during the Ming dynasty it was considered to be well known that the patina (铜绿; 銅綠) on these cash coins would kill pathogens. Kaiyuan Tongbao cash coins are additionally used as a measuring tool for taking excessive amounts of traditional Chinese medicine powder.

During the Southern Song dynasty period, the physician Yang Shiying (杨士瀛), wrote in his work the Straightforward Guide to Recipes and Discourses of [Yang] Renzhai (仁齋直指方論) that simply using ordinary Kaiyuan Tongbao cash coins wasn't enough, rather he recommended using an "imperial concubine" Kaiyuan Tongbao cash coin that had two "moons" (crescent marks) on the reverse side. (Note: Because it is widely believed that the crescents are the personal fingernail marks of Yang Guifei, these cash coins are commonly referred to as imperial concubine money (貴妃錢; Guìfēi qián).) Yang Shiying stated a medical practitioner should place the special Kaiyuan Tongbao cash coin on the hot charcoals of a fire. Kaiyuan Tongbao cash coins not only contain copper but also other metals such as tin and lead. Because the latter metals have a lower melting point than copper, these metals will initially melt and form white "beads" (珠子; Zhūzi). These beads would then have to be mixed with either isotrema moupinense (南木香) or ginseng (人参) to be effective. According to Yang Shiying the white beads formed in this manner have a "miraculous" effect on phlegm (利痰). It is important to be noted that contemporary people during the Song dynasty regarded the molten tin and lead to be equal to the element mercury.

The Ming dynasty period acupuncturist, herbalist, naturalist, pharmacologist, physician, and writer Li Shizhen personally favoured using the Kaiyuan Tongbao for medicinal uses. Li Shizhen, for example, wrote that if someone would chew a Kaiyuan Tongbao cash coin together with 2 or 3 walnuts that this could cure syphilis (梅毒; Méidú). The Kaiyuan Tongbao would also become the favoured cash coin for medicinal uses by later generations of TCM doctors.

During the reign of the Shunzhi Emperor in the initial years of the Qing dynasty period the belief that Kaiyuan Tongbao cash coins are an effective cure for a number of ailments caused the price of these coins to skyrocket. In the work Autumn Lantern Series Talks (秋灯丛话; 秋燈叢話; Qiū dēng cóng huà) it is claimed that the price of a single Kaiyuan Tongbao cash coin was as much as 1000 Shunzhi Tongbao (順治通寳) cash coins. The Autumn Lantern Series Talks further claims that the people of Xiaogan, Hunan suffered from illnesses during the beginning of the Shunzhi reign era and that they benefited from having a number of Kaiyuan Tongbao cash coins to cure them.

Kaiyuan Tongbao cash coins were also used in regional medicines, for example a popular traditional prescription in the Shaanxi province during the Qing dynasty period claimed that to remove something referred to as "dead muscle" (死肌; Sǐ jī) stated that physician should combine 2 Kaiyuan Tongbao cash coins with 2 walnut kernels, and 1 or 2 pieces of sparrow feces, then they should boil the mixture a total of 7 times, quench the mixture a total of 7 times using vinegar and to then apply this concoction to the place of the "dead muscle" externally to supposedly remove it.

The Qing dynasty period Chinese physician Zhao Xuemin (趙學敏) wrote the Supplement to the Compendium of Materia Medica (本草綱目拾遺; Běncǎo gāngmù shíyí), which expanded on the earlier work by Li Shizhen. Zhao Xuemin in his supplemental work considered the Kaiyuan Tongbao cash coin to be so preeminent to be used in traditional Chinese medicine that he included in the supplemental work a summary, which is entitled "Kaiyuan Money" (開元錢), where Zhao Xuemin collected and organised all prescriptions for using the Kaiyuan Tongbao from all major Chinese medical books that existed at the time. The book also notes that if the coin is burned mercury would come out. According to the Supplement to the Compendium of Materia Medica, the Kaiyuan Tongbao could be used as a cure against a large number of diseases and was used for internal medicine, surgery, gynecology, pediatrics, etc. The book describes a pathology referred to "forbidden mouth dysentery" (禁口痢; Jìn kǒu lì) which caused people to throw up after consuming certain types of foods, Zhao Xuemin claimed that heating up the Kaiyuan Tongbao cash coin until it became read, then quenching it with vinegar, grinding it into a powder, and then mixing it with porridge to cure this ailment.

Qing dynasty period author Ji Yun noted in his work Notes of the Thatched Abode of Close Observations (閱微草堂筆記·槐西雜誌) that if a person suffers from a broken bone that a powder made out of a Kaiyuan Tongbao cash coin quenched in vinegar should be administered into the sufferer's body. (Note: Note that in the Notes of the Thatched Abode of Close Observations (閱微草堂筆記·槐西雜誌) Ji Yun refers to these cash coins as "Kaitong Yuanbao" (開通元寳), reading the inscription clockwise.) Ji Yun noted that it would be best to drink the powder with wine. According to the book Kaiyuan Tongbao powder will actively find the place where the suffering originates from and it will form a circle and then begin to connect to the bone and then heal the bone. He claimed to have once tried it on a chicken foot to test if it works and writes that the copper will bundle with it.

=== Bu Quan ===
The Tang dynasty period Tongdian (通典) claims that the Northern Zhou period Bu Quan (布泉) cash coins help conceive boys. This is because people in imperial China had a preference to have more sons than daughters.

=== Zhouyuan Tongbao ===
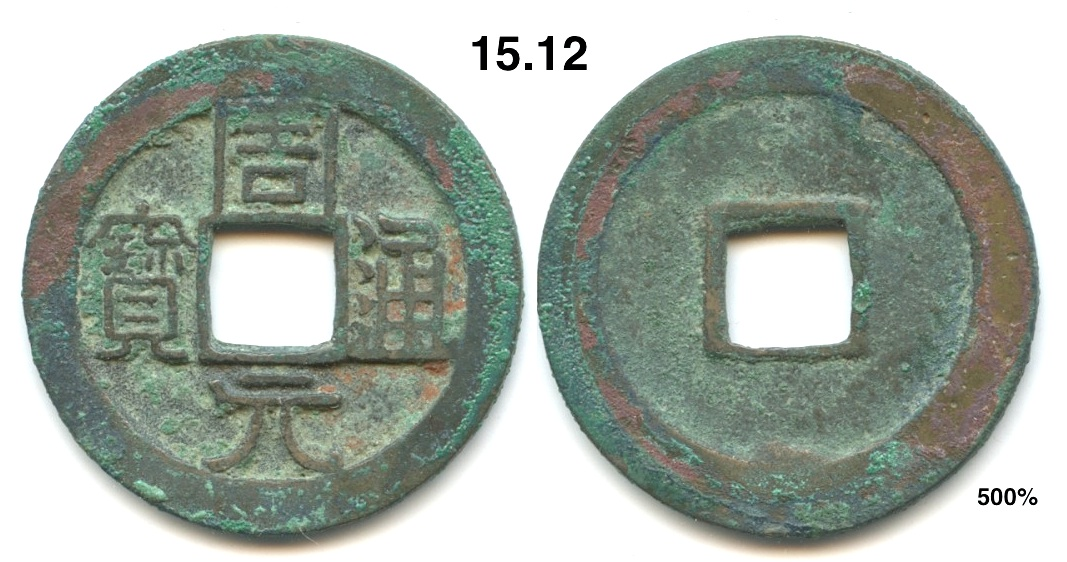
A Zhouyuan Tongbao (周元通寳) cash coin.

The Zhouyuan Tongbao (周元通寳) series of cash coins produced by the Later Zhou has been favoured by practitioners of traditional Chinese medicine for its supposed "medicinal properties". This series of cash coins is often considered to be of "very high quality" because it was cast using the metal taken from confiscated Buddhist statues from 3,356 Buddhist temples. For this reason the Zhouyuan Tongbao is commonly referred to as "Arhat money" (羅漢錢). These cash coins were believed to have spiritual powers inherited from the Buddhist statues, and were subsequently much-copied.

In traditional Chinese medicine the Zhouyuan Tongbao is said to supposedly prevent miscarriages and complications during childbirth.

=== Iron cash coins ===
In the Northern Song dynasty period work the Sheng Ji Lu (聖濟錄) it is recorded that if someone swallows an iron cash coin by accident that they can remedy it by taking 10 ancient copper-alloy cash coins, the edible portions of 10 white plums, which will rot when submerged, and this is then pounded into pills the size of mung beans. The patient is recommended to take one pill each time, swallowing it with running water which will then cause them to spit the iron cash coin out.

=== Chinese numismatic charms ===
A number of Chinese numismatic charms were also believed to have medicinal effects. During the Qing dynasty period it was believed that Wanli Tongbao (萬曆通寳) cash coin amulets with dragon and fenghuang reverse sides should be given to a woman in labour to prevent dystocia. The woman was advised to hold the cash coin amulet in her hand while she was pushing the baby out.

=== Ancient Chinese coinages excluded from traditional Chinese medicine ===
Not all ancient Chinese coinages were equally useful in traditional Chinese medicine, for example the "pointed" knife (尖首刀), particularly the "ming" character knives (明字刀), produced by the Kingdom of Yan during the Warring States period are composed of 50% lead causing serious health problems to anyone attempting to use it in a medicinal way like later bronze coinages were.

== Usage in medicinal teas ==
In traditional Chinese medicine, several medicinal teas incorporate cash coins as ingredients. This usage of cash coins has been documented as early as the Eastern Jin dynasty, in China's first emergency medicine manual, Zhou hou fang (肘後方).

Brass cash coins would first be thoroughly washed before their usage in this process and then boiled in water to produce a type of "tea" which was later consumed by the patient. Practitioners of traditional Chinese medicine believe that the zinc present in cash coins, which had been leached into the slightly acidic liquid, are said to supposedly promote both healing and the enhancement of the immune system. Meanwhile, bronze cash coins which typically have high concentrations of lead and tin (which in traditional Chinese medicine are said to have the same "medicinal properties" as the element mercury), were typically boiled to produce a solution used in traditional Chinese medicine for the treatment of the auris externa. Vietnamese cash coins, which have the highest levels of zinc of any cash coins, were ground up into a powder that was mixed into an aqueous solution or a type of ointment for the treatment of the eyes, ears, and hemorrhoids, or for more topical uses.

== Usage of Chinese cash coins as a medical tool ==
Cash coins are sometimes used as a medical instrument (or a "medical tool") in the practice of guasha (or coining), a technique used in treating many illnesses since ancient times. In some forms of guasha after oil is applied to the skin of the patient the edge of an old Chinese cash coin is used to scrape the skin along acupuncture meridians of the body to rid it of "heatiness" or "negative energies". During the Southern Song dynasty cash coins were used to rub on swollen lips. Typically, after applying guasha a number of bruises (ecchymoses) are left on the skin which typically will disappear after a number of days. Physicians unfamiliar with east Asian and southeast Asian would often confuse coining for child abuse. This practice is highly controversial in Western countries and defendants of the practice try to defend it by claiming that it is an "inherent part of their culture".

The continued usage or cash coins in this practice is because suitably large foreign coins are not considered to be appropriate, as the edges of the coin must be smooth to avoid skin abrasion.

While technique is popular among Chinese people and Vietnamese people who believe in the effectiveness of traditional Chinese medicine, though those critical of it will claim that the only reason guasha would be perceived to be effective is either because the patient believes it works or because the oil that was applied simply already contained working medicinal ingredients.

== Usage among overseas Chinese ==
While the TCM usage of cash coins in China has been well documented and their continued usage among contemporary Chinese-American and Chinese Vietnamese-American populations is known, there isn't much archaeological evidence that documents the medicinal uses of cash coins among overseas Chinese communities in the United States and Canada during the 19th and early 20th centuries. Scholar Marjorie Kleiger Akin in her paper The non-currency functions of Chinese wen in America notes that the current practices of cash coins in traditional Chinese medicine among the overseas Chinese would lead one to believe that some of these practices were current among early Chinese settlers. Chinese herbalists often imported cash coins from China and Vietnam (through Guangdong) for low prices, as they were typically annually produced in the billions, for medicinal and talismanic purposes.

In her book China Men, Chinese-American author Maxine Hong Kingston wrote a number of accounts based on stories she had heard from her elders, in her book she described what may well have possibly been an almost daily routine for early overseas Chinese labourers in the United States. In one story she presented a fictionalised account featuring a number of Chinese agricultural workers in Hawaii, the men are explained to exchange various traditional Chinese remedies for various maladies affecting the joints, such as rheumatism and arthritis. Among these remedies is the treatment for heat illness, where the workers would scrape each other's necks with the edge of a cash coin cooled in water, the square central hole of the coin was used to grip it. The labourers are noted to slap the insides of each other's elbows and knees with the cash coin as this is "where tiredness collects". Akin notes that while the account told by Kingston is fictional, it could have easily been realistically done by Chinese men working in labour camps overseas to treat each other noting that while the archaeological evidence is lacking, it could have realistically taken place in such applications among the early Chinese-American communities and that a few labourers would have kept cash coins around for medicinal purposes.

Akin ended her paper with advice to American archaeologists may be more careful in the regard that Chinese cash coins were historically used in traditional Chinese medicine and that evidence of the medical uses of cash coins could be discovered if they would investigate sites with this in mind. She recommended that future careful examinations of a historical pharmacy site, in particular, may turn up possible proof of their medical uses, which would fill out the picture of the uses of cash coins in overseas Chinese settlements in the Western United States and Western Canada during the century after 1850. In the 2008 article The Luck of Third Street: Archaeology of Chinatown, San Bernardino, California published Historical Archaeology written by Julia G. Costello, Kevin Hallaran, Keith Warren, and Margie Akin, it is stated that the only way archeologists could be sure that a cash coin had been used in Chinese folk medicine would be to find it in direct association with other medicinal products. One of the reasons why this hasn't been found yet (as of 2008) is because cash coins were used as what can be described as "opportunistic tools", as described in both historic documents and ethnographic studies, indicating that cash coins would be taken from one function to another and then back to their "normal use" based on current needs. Meaning that any of the cash coins that have been recovered at historical Chinatowns and related sites, although regularly used as gaming tokens and counters, could have been transitory used in folk medicine being pulled out one day for a coin rubbing treatment and would then tossed back into the box with other cash coins making it difficult to find any archeological evidences for their medicinal uses.

== See also ==
- Chinese herbology
- List of traditional Chinese medicines

== Sources ==
- Compendium of Materia Medica (本草綱目) by Li Shizhen (李時珍).
