= Qianlong Tongbao =

Chinese Qing dynasty coin

Qianlong Tongbao (乾隆通寶)
- Qing dynasty (China)
- Value: 1 wén, 10 wén
- Composition: Copper-alloy (brass) in China Proper and Northern Xinjiang. 98% copper in Southern Xinjiang.
- Years of minting: 1735–1796 (1912) (Note: In Xinjiang coins bearing the inscription Qián Lóng Tōng Bǎo (乾隆通寶) continued to be produced until the fall of the Qing dynasty to commemorate the regions annexation under the Qianlong Emperor, 1 in every 5 coins cast in Xinjiang bear this inscription regardless of era.)

Obverse
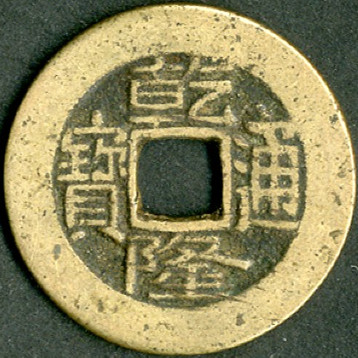
- Design: Qianlong Tongbao (乾隆通寳)

Reverse
- Design: See below.

Qianlong Tongbao (traditional Chinese: 乾隆通寶; simplified Chinese: 乾隆通宝; pinyin: qián lóng tōng bǎo; Vietnamese: Càn Long Thông Bảo) is an inscription used on cash coins produced under the reign of the Qianlong Emperor of the Qing dynasty. Initially the Qianlong Tongbao cash coins were equal to its predecessors in their weight and quality but as expensive military expenditures such as the Ten Great Campaigns began to take their financial toll on the government of the Qing dynasty the quality of these cash coins started to steadily decrease. The weight of the Qianlong Tongbao was changed several times and tin was added to their alloy to both reduce costs and to prevent people from melting down the coins to make utensils. As the intrinsic value of these coins was higher than their nominal value many provincial mints started reporting annual losses and were forced to close down, meanwhile the copper content of the coinage continued to be lowered while the copper mines of China were depleting. The Qianlong era also saw the conquest of Xinjiang and the introduction of cash coins to this new region of the Qing Empire.

As a reminder to the people of Xinjiang that the Manchus conquered the region one in five cash coins produced in that region after the death of the Qianlong Emperor was ordered to bear the inscription "Qianlong Tongbao" (the Qianlong Emperor Money), as a consequence cash coins with this inscription continued to be produced until the end of the dynasty.

== History ==
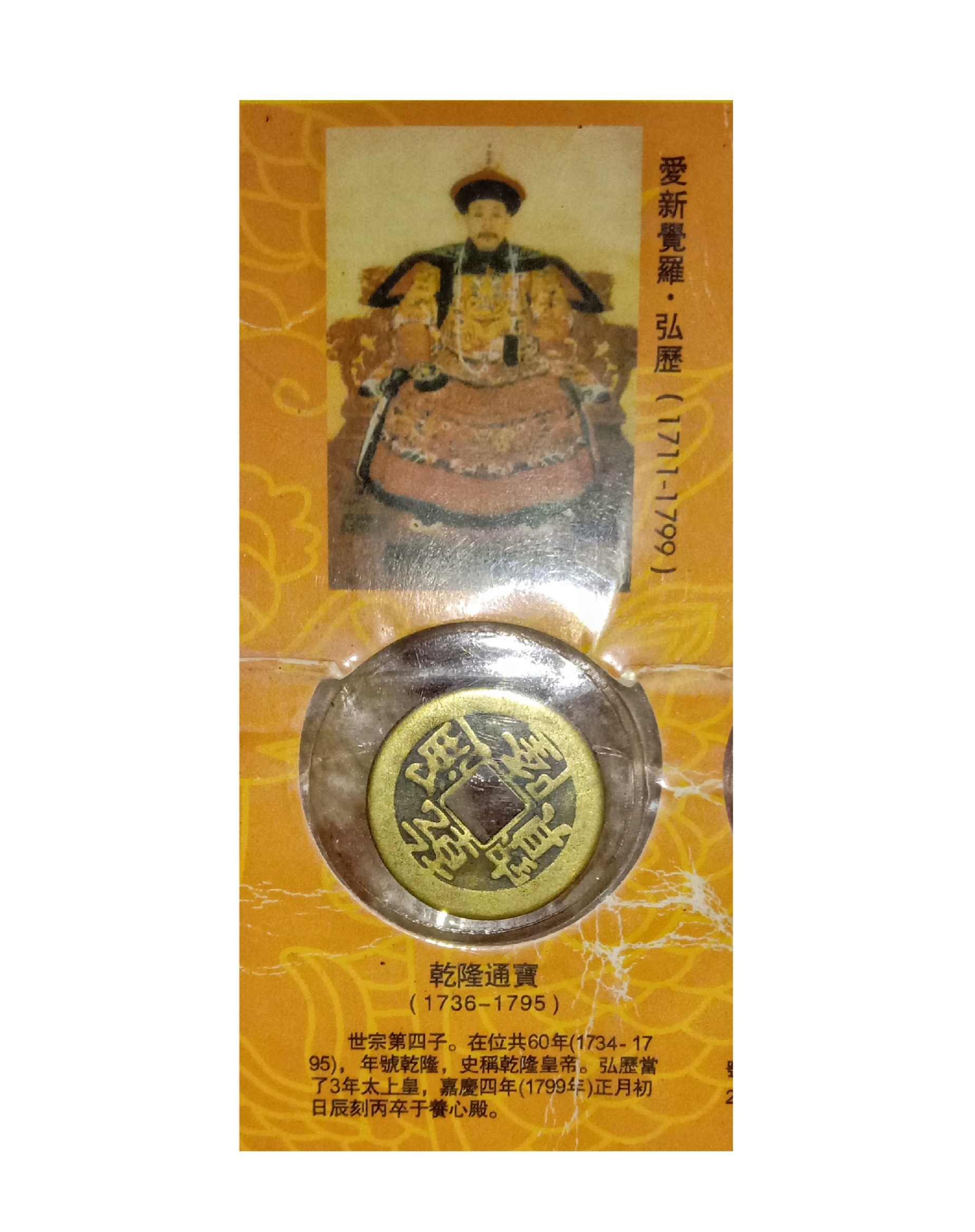
Obverse of the coin, with portrait of Qianlong Emperor, and information written in Mandarin (from a numismatic collection).

During the first few years of the reign of the Qianlong Emperor China had suffered from a shortage of cash coins due to the contemporary scarcity of copper, but soon Yunnan's copper mines started producing a large surplus of copper allowing the Qing government to swiftly increase the money supply and minting more coins at a faster pace. The cash coins produced during this early period are similar in size and quality as the preceding Kangxi Tongbao (康熙通寶) and Yongzheng Tongbao (雍正通寶) cash coins, but over time the quality and size of the Qianlong Tongbao would deteriorate. Like the preceding Yongzheng Tongbao coinage all Qianlong Tongbao cash coins exclusively use Manchu mint marks characterised by the character "ᠪᠣᠣ" (Boo) on the left side and the name of the issuing mint in the Manchu language on the right. A special characteristic of some Qianlong Tongbao cash coins is that the Chinese character "Long" (隆) at the bottom is sometimes written with a "Fou" (缶) instead of the usual "Sheng" (生).

The Qianlong era saw the founding of the Zhili mint in the city of Baoding (保定) as well as several mints in the newly conquered region of Xinjiang, some of these mints oversaw the production of "red cash coins" (紅錢) which were made of nearly pure copper. In the middle of the Qianlong era as much as 3,700,000 strings of cash were produced annually. Early Qianlong Tongbao cash coins contained no tin and were referred to as "yellow cash coins" (黃錢), however in 1740 2% tin was added and in 1741 coins were ordered to be made of an alloy of 50% copper, 41.5% zinc, 6.5% lead, and 2% tin to reduce the likelihood of people melting down coins to make utensils, did not allow to reuse the material because it would become brittle and objects would more easily break. All while the Qing government encouraged to sell their utensils to the state mints to be melted into coinage, these cash coins are commonly referred to as "green cash coins" (青錢) even though their colour appears to be just as yellow as the earlier cash coins. The production cost of these new Qianlong Tongbao cash coins was about 15% of the material value and their intrinsic value exceeded their nominal one. Yet in actuality not all provincial mints followed the imperial directive to change the alloy of the coinage and continued to produce the cheaper copper-zinc alloy which was used before. From this period onwards the Ministry of Public Works Mint manufactured 12,490 strings of cash coins annually (with 1,000 cash coins per string).

By the end of the Qianlong era Yunnan's copper mines started depleting. Thus, the production of cash coins was lowered by the end of the Qianlong era, and the copper content was debased once more. In 1794, all provincial mints were forced to close their doors, but, they were subsequently reopened in 1796.

== Qianlong coinage in Xinjiang ==
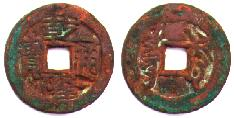
A "red cash coin" bearing the inscription Qianlong Tongbao (乾隆通寳).

=== Pūl-based "red cash coins" in the Southern Circuit ===
In the summer of 1759, the government of the Qing dynasty finished their conquest of Xinjiang, and Xinjiang was divided into three circuits: the Northern Circuit, Eastern Circuit, and Southern Circuit. In the Southern Circuit a different monetary system was used than in the other circuits, as this circuit had been Dzungaria the Dzungar pūl (ﭘول) coin system was retained, these pūl coins composed of 99% copper, these new pūl coins were modeled after the Qianlong Tongbao cash coins, but due to their high copper content were red in colour hence they were known as "red cash coins" (紅錢) however the Qing government now faced the fact that the amount of copper ore available in the region was very little, in order to get the amount of copper needed to manufacture these "red cash coins", General Zhao Hui requested to the Qianlong Emperor in his July 1759 petition if he was allowed to reclaim old pūl coins from the locals to use as scrap metal and cast these new "red cash coins" from. These "red cash coins" had an official exchange rate with the pūl coins that remained in circulation of 1 "red cash" for 2 pūl coins. As Zhao Hui wanted the new can coins to have the same weight as pūl coins they weighed 2 qián (or 7.46 grams) and had both a higher width and thickness than regular cash coins. Red cash coins are also generally marked by their rather crude craftsmanship when compared to the cash coins of China proper. The edges of these coins are often not filed completely and the casting technique is often inaccurate or the inscriptions on them seemed deformed. As the copper used to make these new Qianlong Tongbao cash coins was melted from copper ore or scrap copper by local primitive methods. Therefore, the actual pure copper content in "red cash coins" is usually around 98%, the remaining 2% usually being lead, zinc, and other impurities which were all beyond skills of the local mint technicians in Xinjiang to remove. Sometimes due to circulation or due to corrosion the slag kernels or organic impurities in the body of a particular "red cash coin" would decompose or wear out and would form a comb-like cluster of very small see-through openings which the Chinese refer to as "sand eyes".

At the introduction of red cash system in Southern Xinjiang in 1760, the exchange rate of standard cash (or "yellow cash") and "red cash" was set at 10 standard cash coins were worth 1 "red cash coin". During two or three subsequent years this exchange rate was decreased to 5:1. When used in the Northern or Eastern circuits of Xinjiang, the "red cash coins" were considered equal in value as the standard cash coins that circulated there. The areas where the Dzungar pūls had most circulated such as Yarkant, Hotan, and Kashgar were the sites of mints operated by the Qing government, as the official mint of the Dzungar Khanate was in the city of Yarkent the Qing used this mint to cast the new "red cash coins" and new mints were established in Aksu and Ili. The Yarkant Mint opened its doors in September 1760 and employed 99 people of which 8 were ethnic Han supervisors who were mint workers from the provincial mint of Shaanxi. These Han employees from Shaanxi also brought 2 full sets of both casting and melting equipment with them to aid production. Not only reclaimed pūl coins were used for the production of "red cash coins" as also equipment from the military was used. According to David Hartill the first Qianlong Tongbao cash coins produced at the Yarkant Mint were intended to be a present for the Qianlong Emperor.

The Western cities of the Southern Circuit were poor in natural copper sources and required the reclamation of pūl coins for the production of cash coins while in the Eastern cities of the Southern Circuit such as Aksu, Karashar, Kucha, and Turpan copper was more easily acquired as this area was rich in copper ore. Because of this the government of the Qing dynasty opened a massive mint with six furnaces and employing 360 workers in the city of Aksu in the year 1761, among its employees were technicians sent to oversee the coin production brought in from the mints of the Gansu and Shaanxi provinces. Other than using the copper ore acquired from the region to produce Qianlong Tongbao cash coins, the Aksu Mint also used copper the government accepted as a form of taxation from the population of the eastern part of the Southern city as well as the begs of Aksu. The weight of the Qianlong Tongbao cash coins produced in Aksu was identical to those produced in Yarkent, but they mostly circulated exclusively within the eastern part of the Southern Circuit. After a Muslim uprising against Qing rule occurred in the year 1765 the Qianlong Emperor decreed that a large number of soldiers should go to Turfan. Turfan was later proclaimed to be the administrative capital of the Southern Circuit and in 1766 the Aksu Mint was relocated to Turfan. In 1769 the Yarkent Mint closed its doors and Turfan became the only mint in operation in the Southern Circuit. Initially the "red cash coins" produced in Turfan were the same weight as those previously produced in Yarkant and Aksu but as the supply of copper decreased the weight to 5.595 grams of these Qianlong Tongbao cash coins also decreased in the year 1771, in 1774 this was even further decreased to only 4.476 grams making it equal with the "yellow cash coins" of China proper and Northern Xinjiang. Even in the face of these weight reductions the actual weight of "red cash coins" manufactured in Turfan tended to be around 3.5 grams.

=== Cash coins in the Northern and Eastern Circuits of Xinjiang ===
As the Northern and Eastern Circuits of Xinjiang were mostly inhabited with bartering nomads who did not have a monetary tradition the government of the Qing dynasty did not force these peoples to adopt the monetary system of China. These regions also saw an influx of immigrants from China proper who brought with them their own money and in the Eastern Circuit the local population had already adopted the Chinese monetary culture prior to its conquest by the Qing dynasty so these two circuits would use the same type of cash coins as were used in China proper and did not have to adopt a completely different monetary system. Cash coins from China proper flowed in large numbers to these regions.

The first mint in the Northern Circuit was opened in the city of Yining which was both the military and administrative of the region. It is unclear whether the Yining Mint opened in 1764 (as argued by the Chinese numismatist Ding Fubao) or in 1775. The Yining Mint had a total of twenty-one buildings and its technical staff included two employees from Shaanxi who supervised the local production of Qianlong Tongbao cash coins in Yining. Generally the cash produced by the Yining Mint were of the same weight and size as found in the rest of China and also used the same alloys, but the copper content of Yining cash coins was occasionally higher and the weight of these coins often exceeded the national standard and could weigh more than 5 grams. In the year 1776 a large amount of copper ore was discovered in the proximity of Yining city leading to an increased output of the Yining Mint.

=== Qianlong Tongbao cash coins produced in Xinjiang after the Qianlong era ===
As the Qianlong Emperor ordered in 1775 that 20% of all cash coins cast in Xinjiang should bear the inscription "Qianlong Tongbao" even after the end of his reign as an "eternal reminder" of the Manchu conquest of the region, for this reason the majority of "red cash coins" with this inscription were actually produced after the Qianlong era as their production lasted until the fall of the Qing dynasty in 1911 making many of them hard to attribute. Under the Jiaqing Emperor the cash coins produced by the Aksu Mint continued using the description "Qianlong Tongbao" and made up 20% of all cash coins produced in this era in Aksu. The ratio of Qianlong Tongbao cash coins produced in Xinjiang after the death of the Qianlong Emperor increased at certain times to 30% or even 40%. As so many Qianlong Tongbao cash coins were produced in Xinjiang until 1911 the vast majority of Xinjiang cash coins with this inscription were produced after the Qianlong period.

== Changes in the manufacturing process ==
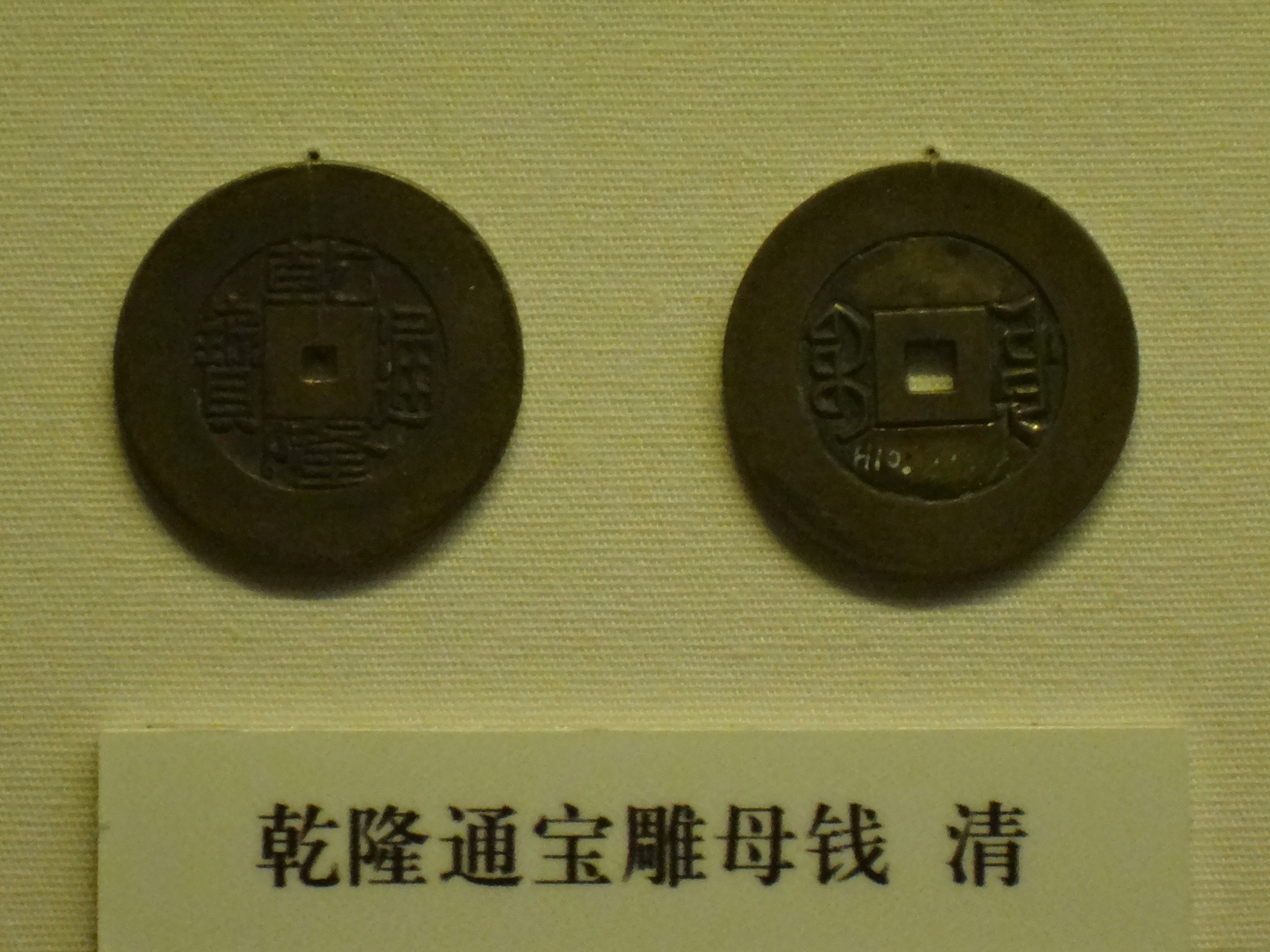
A Qianlong Tongbao (乾隆通寶) ancestor coin produced during the Qing dynasty, on display at the National Museum of China.

Ancestor coins (simplified Chinese: 祖钱; traditional Chinese: 祖錢; pinyin: zǔ qián) also known as engraved mother coins (Chinese: 雕母; pinyin: diāo mǔ) were introduced around 1730 during the Qianlong period in middle of the eighteenth century to improve the quality control of mother coins, these ancestor coins were used to cast more mother coins and from a single ancestor thousands of mother coins could be cast. The production process of making mother coins with ancestor coins was the same as it was for the casting of circulation coins from mother coins, however these coins were usually only produced for a new reign title, when preparing to cast new cash coins with new inscriptions for a recently ascended emperor, a mint would first engrave an ancestor coin out of fine brass which would form the basis for mother coins. The introduction of ancestor coins under the Manchu Qing dynasty lead to all mints having more consistently produced coinages and smaller variations between the coins produced by separate mints in both inscription (or legend) as well as in quality.

== Mint marks ==
List of mint marks:

Mint mark	Möllendorff (Note: Traditional Chinese and Arabic scripts are transliterated using their respective romanisations.)	Place of minting	Province	Image
ᠪᠣᠣ ᠴᡳᠣᠸᠠᠨ	Boo Ciowan	Ministry of Revenue (hùbù, 戶部), Beijing	Zhili	
ᠪᠣᠣ ᠶᡠᠸᠠᠨ	Boo Yuwan	Ministry of Public Works (gōngbù, 工部), Beijing	Zhili	
ᠪᠣᠣ ᡶᡠ	Boo Fu	Fuzhou	Fujian	
ᠪᠣᠣ ᡤᡠᠸᠠᠩ	Boo Guwang	Guangzhou	Guangdong	
ᠪᠣᠣ ᡤᡠᡳ	Boo Gui	Guilin	Guangxi	
ᠪᠣᠣ ᡤᡳᠶᠠᠨ	Boo Giyan	Guiyang	Guizhou	
ᠪᠣᠣ ᠨᠠᠨ	Boo Nan	Changsha	Hunan	
ᠪᠣᠣ ᠰᡠ	Boo Su	Suzhou	Jiangsu	
ᠪᠣᠣ ᠴᠠᠩ	Boo Chang	Nanchang	Jiangxi	
ᠪᠣᠣ ᠵᡳ	Boo Ji	Jinan	Shandong	
ᠪᠣᠣ ᠵᡳᠨ	Boo Jin	Taiyuan	Shanxi	
ᠪᠣᠣ ᠰᠠᠨ	Boo San	Xi'an	Shaanxi	
ᠪᠣᠣ ᠴᡠᠸᠠᠨ	Boo Chuwan	Chengdu	Sichuan	
ᠪᠣᠣ ᠶᡡᠨ	Boo Yūn	Various cities	Yunnan	
ᠪᠣᠣ ᠵᡝ	Boo Je	Hangzhou	Zhejiang	
ᠪᠣᠣ ᡷᡳ	Boo Jyi	Baoding	Zhili	
ᠠᡴᠰᡠ ئاقسۇ	Aksu Ak̡su	Aksu	Xinjiang	
阿 ᠠᡴᠰᡠ ئاقسۇ	Ā Aksu Ak̡su	Aksu	Xinjiang	
ᠪᠣᠣ ᡳ	Boo I	Ghulja	Xinjiang	
庫 局 ᡴᡠᠴ‍‍‍‍‍‍‍ᡝ كۇچار	Kù Jú Kuche Kucha	Kucha	Xinjiang	
ᠪᠣᠣ ᡴᡠᠴ‍‍‍‍‍‍‍ᡝ	Boo Kuche	Kucha (Note: all Guangxu period issues.)	Xinjiang	
ᠪᠣᠣ ᠴᡳᠣᠸᠠᠨ	Boo Ciowan	Kucha	Xinjiang	
ᠪᠣᠣ ᠶᡠᠸᠠᠨ	Boo Yuwan	Kucha	Xinjiang	
庫 十 ᠪᠣᠣ ᠴᡳᠣᠸᠠᠨ	Kù Shí Boo Ciowan	Kucha	Xinjiang	
庫 十 ᠪᠣᠣ ᠶᡠᠸᠠᠨ	Kù Shí Boo Yuwan	Kucha	Xinjiang	
喀 什 ᠪᠣᠣ ᠴᡳᠣᠸᠠᠨ	Kā Shí Boo Ciowan	Kucha (Note: These cash coins were all minted in Kucha for circulation in Kashgar.)	Xinjiang	
喀 十 ᠪᠣᠣ ᠶᡠᠸᠠᠨ	Kā Shí Boo Yuwan	Kucha (Note: These cash coins were all minted in Kucha for circulation in Kashgar.)	Xinjiang	
ᡠᠰᡥᡳ ئۇچتۇرپان	Ushi Uchturpan	Uši	Xinjiang	
ᠶᡝᡵᡴᡳᠶᠠᠩ يەكەن	Yerkiyang Yəkən	Yarkant	Xinjiang	

== Qianlong Tongbao charms ==
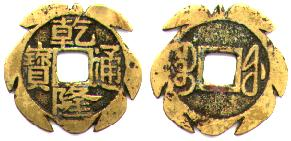
A Qianlong Tongbao (乾隆通寶) cash coin carved into the shape of a peach representing the peaches of immortality.

There is a type of Chinese numismatic charm with the inscription Qianlong Tongbao which might have been cast during the reign of the Qianlong Emperor which is 56 millimeters in diameter and has a thickness of just slightly more than 3 millimeters. The Chinese characters of this amulet are also different style from those of circulating Qianlong Tongbao cash coins, such as the bottom part of the "Bao" (寶) and the radical portion of the "Tong" (通). The Manchu characters on the reverse side of this amulet indicate that it was manufactured at the Ministry of Revenue Mint in Beijing. However, these Manchu characters appear to be very large compared to other Manchu mint marks and are rotated 90 degrees clockwise. The intention of this may have had political motivations but the meaning of why this was done remains unclear today.

Another method how Qianlong Tongbao cash coins are used as charms is by stringing them together in the shape of a sword, these amulets are referred to as "Chinese coin swords", these Chinese coin swords consist of either one or two iron rods which are used as their foundation and the Qianlong Tongbao coins (but sometimes other inscriptions may also be used) are fastened with a red string, cord, or wire. A Chinese coin sword is usually about 60 centimeter long and typically consists of around one hundred bronze Chinese cash coins. One of these Chinese coin swords made with Qianlong Tongbao cash coins is in the collection of the British Museum.

=== Coin dragon ===
At the Hall of Mental Cultivation in the Forbidden City, Beijing there is a coin dragon (traditional Chinese: 錢龍; simplified Chinese: 钱龙; pinyin: Qián lóng) made of Qianlong Tongbao cash coins, these cash coins are all about 2.8 centimeters in diameter and are identical in every way to those that were minted for normal circulation. But as none of the Qianlong Tongbao used for this coin dragon show any wear it seems that these were all freshly cast for the creation of this sculpture.

The coin dragon's backboard is composed of paperboard on which a colourful Chinese dragon is painted. The strings of Qianlong Tongbao cash coins create the form of a Chinese dragon, these cash coins are attached to the paperboard backboard and Hall of Mental Cultivation's roof beam by "gold-plated round-head copper nails". The coin dragon is 182 centimeters (5.97 ft) in length and 47 cm (1.5 ft) in height.

According to Mr. Zhou Qian (周乾), a researcher at the Palace Museum, the Qianlong Tongbao coin dragon could be described as "About 2 meters long, mighty and shocking with fierce teeth and dancing claws, creating clouds and driving the mist" (该钱龙长约2米，张牙舞爪，做腾云驾雾状，形象威武，极具震慑感。).

As no known historical documents recorded the existence of this coin dragon it is possible that it was in fact meant to remain a secret hidden away from sight.

The coin dragon was likely installed during a Shang Liang (traditional Chinese: 上樑; simplified Chinese: 上梁; pinyin: Shàng liáng) ceremony, this is evident of the remnants of the red silk satin from this topping-out ceremony which occurred several centuries ago. Shang Liang ceremonies were when the main roof beam of a palace building was raised and installed. During these ceremonies Good luck charms, which frequently included cash coins, would traditionally be attached to one of the palace's roof beams in order to provide protection from evil spirits, fire, and other potential disasters. There would also be good luck charms that included wishes for peace and good fortune. The coin dragon thus serves as the supreme representation of the Chinese belief in numismatic charms as objects with supernatural powers which are able to defeat ghosts and demons, deter disastrous events, and bring both peace and good luck to those in possession of them.

While dragons had been symbols of imperial authority for centuries this is the only coin dragon ever known to have been created in the history of the Chinese Empire. The reason why a coin dragon was created during the reign of the Qianlong Emperor was because the Mandarin word for "Coin dragon" (Qián lóng) sounds like the reign name of the emperor (Qián lóng) meaning that it was seen as a fitting tribute to the supreme authority of the Qing empire and as it was made of cash coins it could be seen as a symbol of wealth to represent the power and prosperity of the Qing.

What remains an unsolved mystery is the fact that every leg of the coin dragon only has 4 claws on each leg as opposed to five, as imperial dragons are typically five-clawed as only the emperor and his immediate family could display five-claw dragons, while three-clawed and four-clawed dragons were symbols of government officials below the emperor.

== Battle of Ngọc Hồi-Đống Đa issues ==
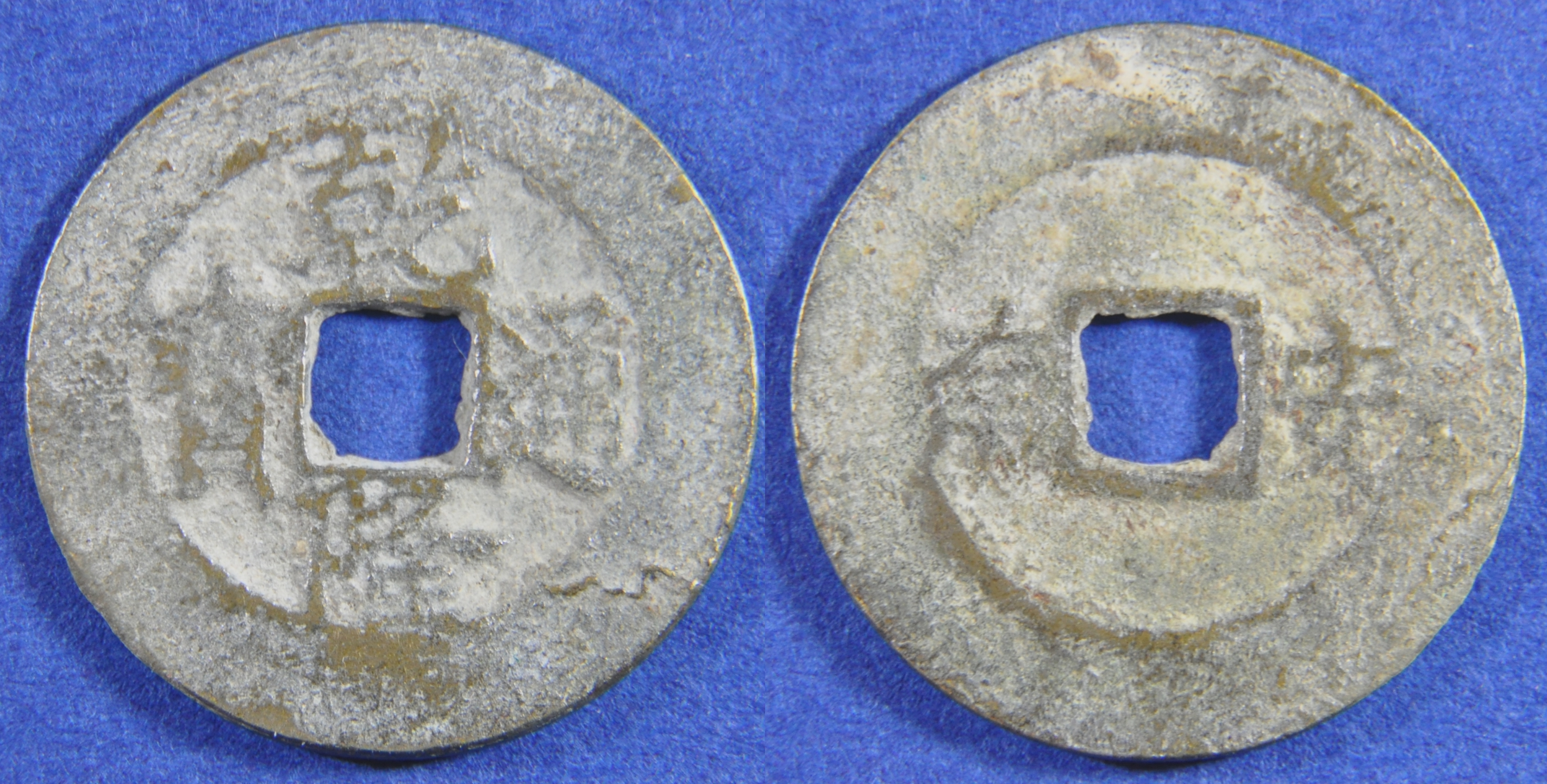
A Qianlong Tongbao (乾隆通寶) cash coin issued for "Annam" (安南).

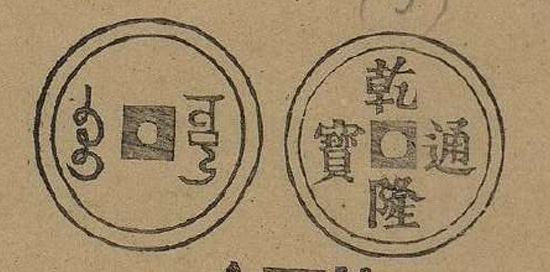
A Qianlong Tongbao coin depicted in Mechanics and Crafts of the People of Annam.

After the Tây Sơn Rebellion ousted the Revival Lê dynasty from Northern Vietnam the Qianlong Emperor ordered his armies to invade Annam (Vietnam) and restore the Revival Lê dynasty. This army would be commanded by the Viceroy of Liangguang, Sun Shiyi (孫士毅). Two armies invaded Vietnam in November 1788 with one army composed of Guangdongers marching in from Guangxi and another one entering from Yunnan led by General Wu Dajing (烏大經), these armies would team up with Vietnamese soldiers loyal to the Later Lê dynasty. These armies would easily defeat the Tây Sơn dynasty at several battles and took Thăng Long (modern Hanoi) on November 19, 1788, reinstating Emperor Lê Chiêu Thống (黎昭統). After the forces of the Quang Trung Emperor (光中帝) retook Hanoi and expelled the Chinese and Revival Lê forces back over the Chinese border the Viceroy of Yungui, Fu Gangan (富綱安) was chosen to head the army and marched back into Vietnam and concluded a truce recognising the revolutionary government. During this episode special Qianlong Tongbao cash coins were cast in the province of Yunnan as payment for the Chinese troops who engaged in this invasion which featured the characters "安南" (The Pacified South) on their reverse.

== See also ==
- List of Chinese cash coins by inscription

== Sources ==
- Hartill, David (September 22, 2005). Cast Chinese Coins. Trafford, United Kingdom: Trafford Publishing. ISBN 978-1412054669.
- Hartill, David, Qing cash, Royal Numismatic Society Special Publication 37, London, 2003.
