= Coin-sword =

Chinese numismatic charm

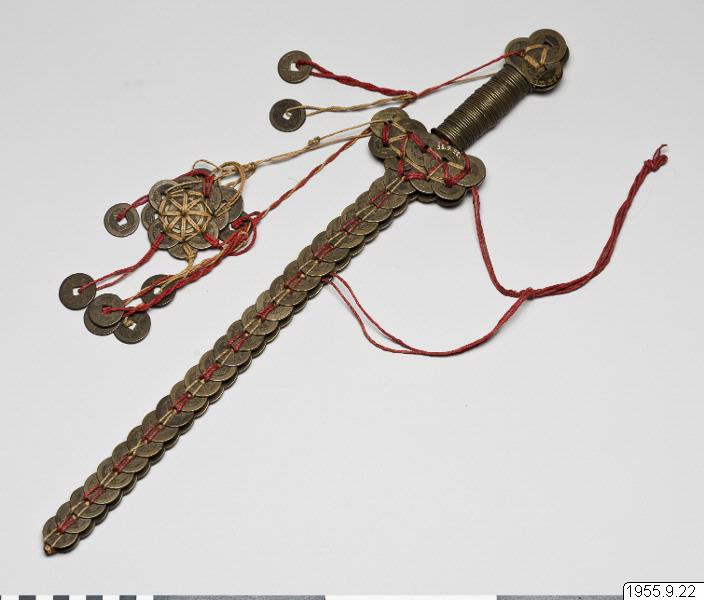
A Chinese coin sword-shaped talisman made from Qing dynasty era cash coins on display at the Museum of Ethnography, Sweden

Coin-swords (alternatively spelt as coin swords), or cash-swords, are a type of Chinese numismatic charms that are a form of feng shui talisman that were primarily used in southern China to ward off evil spirits and malicious influences, especially those inducing fever. These coin-swords are also often used in Taoist rituals. Coin-swords are considered an "evil-warding sword" (Chinese: 避邪劍; pinyin: bì xié jiàn) in China.

Coin-swords usually consist of Qing dynasty era cash coins, specifically from the Kangxi and Qianlong eras, but may also be made from older cash coins.

Coin-swords were also often used by overseas Chinese communities, such as those living in the United States or in Canada, during the 19th and early 20th centuries and merchants and individuals would often purchase cash coins to bring them to these overseas communities to make them into wedding gifts. Coin swords were commonly given to newlyweds to hang over the marriage bed as a means to insure bliss and harmony. These coin-swords are typically an approximate length of 35 cm to 50 cm and require a minimum of 50 coins to make, while the older, larger, and more elaborately decorated coin-swords would typically contain around 150 cash coins.

== Names ==
In Mandarin Chinese, coin-swords are known by various names such as bixiejian (simplified Chinese: 辟邪剑; traditional Chinese: 辟邪劍; pinyin: bixiejian; trans. "evil-averting sword") (of which they are a sub-type), qianjian (钱剑; 錢劍; "coin-sword"), guqianjian (古钱剑; 古錢劍; "ancient coin-sword"), and tongqianjian (铜钱剑; 銅錢劍; "copper coin-sword").

== Composition of coin-swords ==
Chinese coin-swords generally consist of either one or two iron rods as a foundation with real or replica Chinese cash coins fastened together with a string, a cord, or a wire which are usually coloured red. While the thread is usually red, it may sometimes also be yellow or gold as these are considered to be the colours of royalty.

Coin-swords generally consist of:

- 18 Chinese cash coins located on the surface of the coin-blade that is 3 cash coins thick.
- 5 Chinese cash coins on each side of the hilt that is usually 3 coins thick.
- 6 Chinese cash coins from the hilt to the butt of the handle that is usually 3 cash coins thick.
- 1 Chinese cash coin on each side of the handle butt that is usually 3 cash coins thick.

A typical Chinese coin-sword is about 0.6 meter, or about 2 feet in the imperial system of units, long and consists of around one hundred copper-alloy Chinese cash coins. In superstition it is usually considered better for all the Chinese cash coins strung together in the coin-sword to have been produced during the reign of only a single Chinese emperor, and may not be mixed with cash coins from other dynasties. Ancient Chinese cash coins are also generally preferred over more modern ones.

Coin-swords are constructed out of three different kinds of things, each of which is regarded as a preventive of evil spirits in feng shui.

== Uses in feng shui ==
A popular way sword symbolism in integrated in Chinese numismatic talismans is by stringing actual or replicas of cash coins into a sword-shape. In feng shui, these coin-swords are often hung to frighten away demons and evil spirits. Coin-swords are frequently hung above the bed, on residential walls, on the front and the outside of the bridal bed-curtain, or above the windows of a building. It is believed that evil spirits would not dare molest the residents of the house where the coin-sword hangs because the sword resembles that wielded by the Taoist immortal Zhong Kui, who in Chinese mythology is famous for being a slayer of evil demons. Most Chinese coin-swords consist of Qianlong Tongbao (乾隆通寳) cash coins.

The supposed powers of coin-swords do not come from the associated wealth symbolism that usually comes with cash coins. But with the design form of the cash coins used to make the sword, as well as the dynastic origins of the cash coins that carry the Emperor's reign era title. As such, in feng shui the supposed power of the coin-swords will depend heavily on which Chinese emperor's inscription is written down on the cash coins.

About the time of a woman's confinement after her marriage, a coin-sword is sometimes taken to be hung inside of the bridal bed-curtain, usually in a position that is parallel to the horizon.

Coin-swords made from Qing dynasty cash coins with the inscription Kangxi Tongbao (康熙通寶) are considered to be the most effective, this is because the reign of the Kangxi Emperor of the Qing dynasty lasted an entire 60-year cycle of the Chinese calendar and thus according to feng shui cash coins with this inscription represent "longevity". These cash coins are furthermore preferred because the name "Kangxi" means "good health" and "prosperity".

== Uses in Taoist rituals ==
Share K. Lew, a Taoist monk trained at the White Cloud Monastery near Beijing who moved to San Diego, California, explains that coin-swords are commonly used among overseas Chinese Taoist monks as a substitute for the traditional sandalwood swords used in China. These sandalwood swords are used to ward off ghosts and evil spirits and coin-swords fulfil the same purpose in overseas Chinese Taoist rituals. This is as sandalwood swords are difficult to obtain outside of China.

== Sword symbolism in Chinese numismatic charms ==
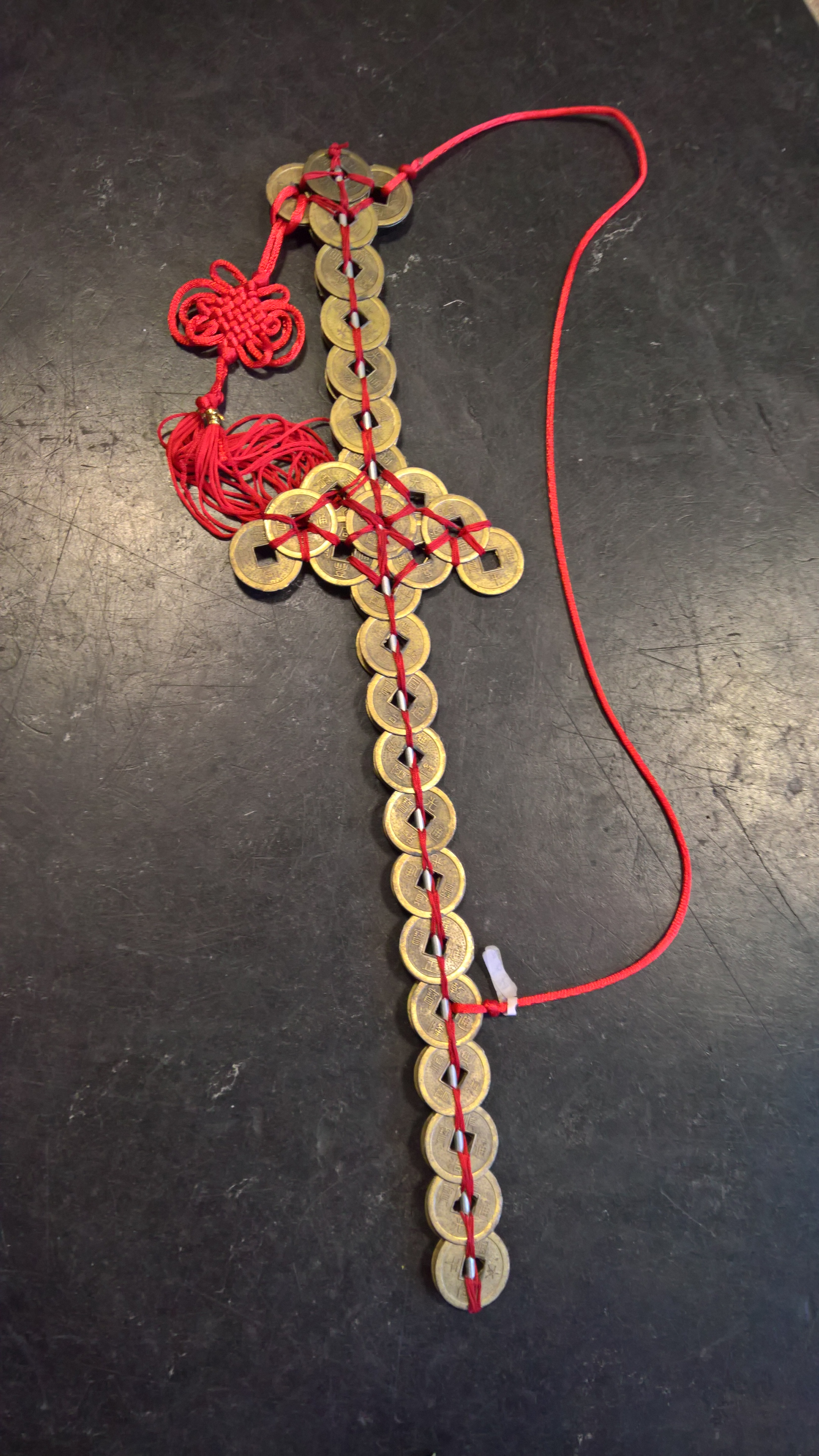
A modern coin-sword made from replicas of Qing dynasty cash coins in Winschoten, Groningen

True Chinese numismatic charms and amulets did not begin to appear in China until sometime during the Han dynasty and the sword, or frequently a pair of swords, as objects invested with power became frequently seen symbols in Chinese numismatic charms from this time on.

Swords are a common theme on Chinese numismatic charms, and coins were often assembled into sword-shaped talismans. Most Chinese numismatic charms that feature swords often show a single sword. According to Chinese legends, the first swords in China appeared under the reign of the legendary Yellow Emperor. During the Spring and Autumn period, the notion developed that swords could be used against evil spirits and demons. Under the Liu Song dynasty swords became a common instrument in religious rituals, most particularly in Taoist rituals; according to the Daoist Rituals of the Mystery Cavern and Numinous Treasure (洞玄靈寶道學科儀) it was essential for students of Taoism to be able to forge swords which had the capability to dispel demonic entities. Many Taoist sects formed during this period believed that swords could defeat demons and also contained medical properties. Under the Sui and Tang dynasties ritualistic swords constructed of peach wood started to appear. Around this time, Chinese amulets with sword themes began to be produced; often these amulets resembled Chinese cash coins but had crossed swords decorated with ribbons or fillets on them, as the ancient Chinese believed that these items enhanced the powers of the item they were tied to. Chinese swords were commonly engraved with imagery representing the Big Dipper, which was believed to have unlimited magical power, and this also became common for charms that featured swords.

The image of two swords on Chinese amulets stems from a legend where Taoist leader Zhang Daoling saw Laozi appear to him on a mountain in present-day Sichuan and gave him two swords. Alternatively, two swords can also represent two dragons from a legend where a man named Lei Huan (雷煥) received two swords and gave one to his son Lei Hua (雷華), who lost it in a river; a servant tasked with retrieving it witnessed two coiled and entwined Chinese dragons.

Chinese talismans of swordsmen usually depict one of the Taoist immortals Zhong Kui or Lu Dongbin. Swordsmen also appear on zodiac charms, Bagua charms, elephant chess pieces, lock charms, and other Chinese numismatic charms. Another person who appears on Chinese amulets is Zhenwu, who is regarded as the perfect warrior.

Taoist priests use coin-swords because of this symbolism for rituals for ridding evil, a red cloth is then wrapped on the hilt of the sword. Taoist priests can also sometimes use a peach wood sword as an alternative to coin-swords.

== Coin-swords in Western museums ==
Coin-swords can be found in the collections of various museums across the Western world such as the British Museum in London (UK), the Durham University Archaeology Laboratory Collection (UK), the National Museum of American History (US), the National Museum of Scotland (UK), Horniman Museum and Gardens (UK), the Science Museum in London (UK), among a large number of other museums.

== Sources ==
- Doolittle, Justus (1868). Social Life of the Chinese: A Daguerreotype of Daily Life in China. London: S. Low, son, and Marston. pp. 563–565.
