= Da Shu coinage =

Historical Chinese currency

The coinage of the Great Shu Kingdom (Traditional Chinese: 大蜀貨幣 / 大蜀起義軍鑄) is the earliest known coinage produced by a peasant revolt in the history of China, the revolt lasted from 993 until 995 and during this period a small number of cash coins were produced by the peasant rebellion using the era names of the rebel leader Li Shun. It was only with the strongest military efforts that the Song dynasty was able to suppress the rebellion and restore their rule over the Shu region. The coinage produced by the Da Shu Kingdom is often rather roughly produced and as the rebellion only lasted a few years not many cash coins were produced leading to them being extremely rare today.

The first two inscriptions were produced for five months under King Li Shun while after his death the remaining rebels introduced a new inscription which was produced for a year until the rebellion was finally put down.

== Background ==
Three decades after the Song dynasty was founded its government still had issues consolidating its power and rule over China and didn't properly address the most important social issues that plagued the population. The economy of the Song dynasty was in a bad shape during this period and around the country peasants were forming their own armies to rebel against the government and started killing corrupt government officials. The largest of these peasant revolts was organised by tea farmers and landless tenant farmers (旁戶, páng hù) in the Shu region (蜀, the modern day province of Sichuan) where these peasants were protesting exploitation by rich landowners of the Sichuan Basin and the Song government's state monopoly on the purchasing of tea (均貧富, bó mǎi wù), this monopoly prevented the tea farmers from obtaining a reasonable income to live off. Another contributing factor to the bad living conditions of the peasantry at the time was a severe drought that devastated the country while the Song dynasty was suffering heavy losses against both the Khitans and the Tanguts. By the year 993 the number of participants of the uprising in Sichuan had reached several hundred thousand farmers.

The revolt adopted the motto "equalise the income of the rich and poor" (均貧富, jūn pín fù) and under the leadership of Wang Xiaobo (王小波) were able to beat the government's military forces stationed in Sichuan and after taking over state granaries distributed the grain that was present among themselves. After Wang Xiaobo was killed in action, his brother-in-law Li Shun (李顺) took over his position and managed to take the city of Chengdu. After this victory Li Shun crowned himself as the "King of Great Shu" (大蜀王, dà shǔ wáng) in the year 994 and proclaimed the period title of "Yingyun" (應運, yìng yùn).

== History ==
From the year 994 Li Shun began the production of both bronze and iron cash coins with the legends Yingyun Tongbao (應運通寶) and Yingyun Yuanbao (應運元寶), these inscriptions are read in a clockwise manner (旋讀, xuán dú) and the type of Chinese calligraphy used on them is Bafen script (八分書, bā fēn shū) which is a conservative type of clerical script (隸書, lì shū). These cash coins notably resemble the older cash coins produced by the kingdoms of Former Shu and Later Shu during the Five Dynasties and Ten Kingdoms period, both of these states were situated in the same region as the Da Shu Kingdom and shared the same capital city. However, as Li Shun was killed and as he only ruled over the newly proclaimed Kingdom of Da Shu for five months his former subordinates began casting both bronze and iron cash coins with the legend Yinggan Tongbao (應感通寶) after his death. These cash coins continued to be produced for around a year until the uprising was finally suppressed by the forces of the Song dynasty in the year 995.

The workmanship of the casting techniques used to produce Da Shu coinage is relatively rough, the reverse sides of these cash coins is usually flat and blank, and the colour of copper-alloy coins tend to be whitish. All Da Shu cash coins are cast in the size of the 1 wén denomination (小平錢). As the logistics of transporting the coinage across the Shu region proved troublesome and as Li Shun barely held much territory outside of Chengdu these cash coins only circulated in a very small area.

== List of cash coins issued by the Da Shu Kingdom ==
List of cash coins issued by the Great Shu Kingdom:

Inscription	Traditional Chinese	Simplified Chinese	King	Image
Yingyun Tongbao	應運通寶	应运通宝	Li Shun (李顺)	
Yingyun Yuanbao	應運元寶	应运元宝	Li Shun (李顺)	
Yinggan Tongbao	應感通寶	应感通宝	None	

== Surviving specimens ==
As the cash coins of the Da Shu Kingdom weren't produced in great numbers and not many of them have survived, they are extremely rare today and are listed among "China’s 50 Rarest Ancient Coins" (歷代古錢五十珍, lì dài gǔ qián wǔ shí zhēn). A number of them are on display in various museums in China or are in the hands of private collectors. In the year 2015 a Yinggan Tongbao cash coin with a diameter of 23.7 millimeters sold for $ 54,000 (¥ 368,000) at an auction in China.

The private coin collector Sun Ding (孫鼎) donated a Yingyun Yuanbao to the Shanghai Museum in the twentieth century, this cash coin is reportedly made from bronze and has a weight of 2.9 grams. Another bronze Yingyun Yuanbao cash coin is the possession of the National Museum of China this particular coin has a diameter of 23 millimeters, however unlike the one in the Shanghai Museum this one weighs 3.9 grams. Unique to this coin is that unlike other cash coins produced by the Da Shu regime is that this coin has a dot (星, "star") and a crescent (月, "moon") on its reverse side (月孕星版, yuè yùn xīng bǎn) which are similar to the symbols found on other cash coins as well as Chinese charms and amulets. This was long thought to be the only Da Shu coin with these symbols but in January 2016 a Yingyun Tongbao cash coin was excavated in Hubei that also featured a dot and crescent on its reverse, but as this particular cash coin is 26 millimeters in diameter it's actually believed to be a "pattern coin" or "trial coin" (試樣, shì yàng) or perhaps a "mother coin" (鐵母, tiě mǔ).

Additionally the National Museum of China is in possession of an iron Yingyun Tongbao that has the same diameter but weighs 3.7 grams as its composed of different metal, and a bronze Yinggan Tongbao with a diameter of 23 millimeters that weighs 3.2 grams. The Sichuan Museum is in possession of an iron Yinggan Tongbao cash coin with a diameter of 23 millimeters.

== See also ==
- Southern Song dynasty coinage

== Sources ==
- Hartill, David (2005). Cast Chinese Coins: A Historical Catalogue. Trafford. ISBN 978-1-4120-5466-9.
