= Kangxi Tongbao =

Chinese Qing dynasty coin

Kangxi Tongbao (康熙通寶)
- Qing dynasty (China)
- Value: 1 wén
- Composition: Copper-alloy (brass)
- Years of minting: 1661–1722

Obverse
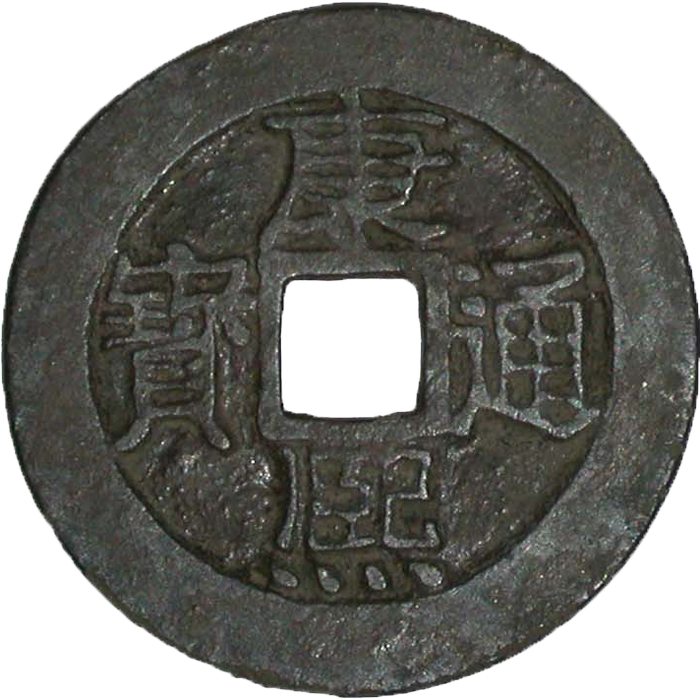
- Design: Kangxi Tongbao (康熙通寶)

Reverse
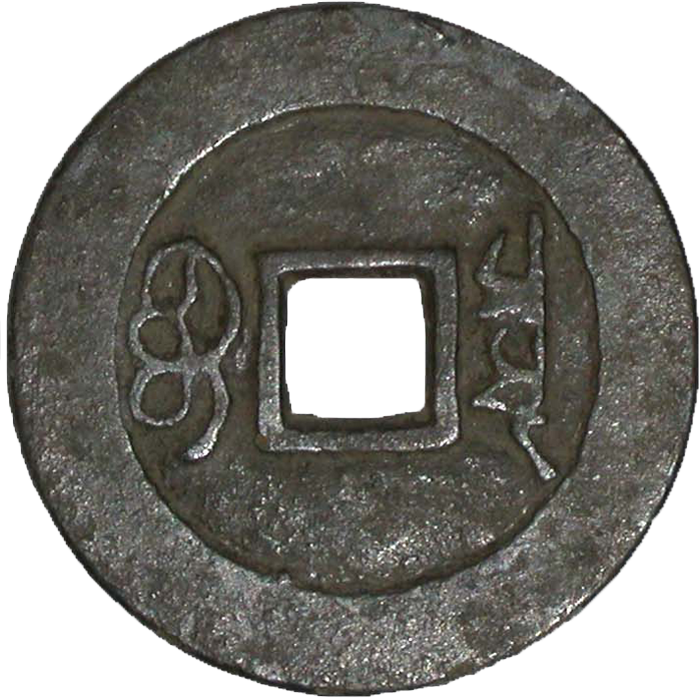
- Design: See below.

Kangxi Tongbao (traditional Chinese: 康熙通寶; simplified Chinese: 康熙通宝; pinyin: kāng xī tōng bǎo) refers to an inscription used on Chinese cash coins produced during the reign of the Kangxi Emperor of the Manchu-led Qing dynasty. Under the Kangxi Emperor the weights and standards of the brass cash coins changed several times and the bimetallic system of Qing dynasty coinage was established. Today Kangxi Tongbao cash coins are commonly used as charms and amulets where different forms of superstition have developed arounds its mint marks and calligraphy.

A notable characteristic is that the outer rim on Kangxi Tongbao cash coins on both sides of the coin tend to be quite wide, in contrast to that of the square center hole (方穿, fāng chuān). Apart from the two mints in the capital city of Beijing operated by the central government, many provincial mints operated intermittently.

== Background ==
After the Manchus occupied Beijing in 1644, the government of the Qing dynasty began the production of the Shunzhi Tongbao (順治通寶) cash coins modeled after the Huichang Kaiyuan Tongbao cash coins (會昌開元通寶錢) of the Tang dynasty and the Dazhong Tongbao (大中通寶) and Hongwu Tongbao (洪武通寶) of the early Ming dynasty. Like these cash coins the Shunzhi Tongbao used mint marks in the form of a single Chinese character on the reverse side of the coin to indicate their origin. Other types of Shunzhi Tongbao were also cast creating a total of 5 different types. Under the Kangxi Emperor only two of these types were retained, one type had a Manchu characters on the left side of the reverse and a Chinese character on the right side of the reverse to indicate the mint of production and was used for provincial mints. The other type had the name of the mint in Manchu on the right side with the character "ᠪᠣᠣ" (Boo) on the left which were used for cash coins produced at the Ministry of Revenue and Ministry of Public Works.

== History ==
In the year Kangxi 1 (or the Gregorian year 1662), all provincial mints in the Qing dynasty were closed down with the exception of the Jiangning Mint. Meanwhile, in Kangxi 5 (1667) all provincial mints would re-open again but three years later a large number of them would close down due to the high price of copper in China at the time. In the year Kangxi 7 (1668), the Guangzhou Mint in Guangdong started casting Kangxi Tongbao cash coins with a weight of 1.4 Mace (1 mace = 3.73 gram) which was heavier than those in many other provinces. Those responsible for the transportation of copper rarely made the mints in time, and while copper prices were rising daily the Ministry of Revenue still maintained a fixed rate of exchange between copper and silver causing many provincial mints to quickly lose money, while on paper they were still profitable.

A mint was established in Tainan, Taiwan in the year 1689, but it did not produce much cash coins and was closed down in 1692; for this reason Taiwanese Kangxi Tongbao coins tend to be very rare today. Kangxi Tongbao cash coins produced in the province of Yunnan are notably quite reddish in colour; there were at least seven different mints in existence in Yunnan Province during the Kangxi period. After, the governor of the Yunnan and Guizhou found out that there were so much brass cash coins produced by the Yunnan mints. The high supply of the brass cash coins had caused the price of the cash coins relative to silver to reduce. The government needed to pay 30% of cash coins instead of silver as military salary. This proved to be very inconvenient for the soldiers. This later caused disturbances to arise in the military. After the governor of these provinces put down the trouble, he urged the government to cease the production of cash coins in the province of Yunnan and to pay the soldiers exclusively in silver. All the Yunnan Mints were then closed down in the year Kangxi 28 (1689). Between the years 1674 and 1681 during the Revolt of the Three Feudatories the province of Yunnan was in the hands of the rebel Wu Sangui and later his grandson Wu Shifan who cast his own cash coins with their own inscriptions there, these cash coins didn't use the same mint marks as the Kangxi Tongbao.

In 1684, the ratio of copper to zinc in the alloys in the Kangxi Tongbao cash coins was reduced from 70% to 60% all while the standard weight was lowered to 1 qián again and were known as Zhongqian (重錢), while the central government's mints in Beijing started producing cash coins with a weight of 0.7 qián known as Xiaoqian (小錢) or Qingqian (輕錢). The Kangxi Tongbao was officially fixed against silver with a ratio of 1000 Zhongqian per tael of silver in an attempt to establish a bimetallic system. The Xiaoqian were only worth 0.7 tael of silver per string of 1000 coins (which would equate to 14.3 Xiaoqian per fen of silver), however by the middle of the eighteenth century the Xiaoqian disappeared from circulation.

By 1702 all provincial mints were closed again due to the aforementioned circumstances.

== Mint marks ==
Under the Kangxi Emperor cash coins with the inscription Kangxi Tongbao were produced with both a Chinese character and a Manchu character on the reverse side of the coin at provincial mints, while the Ministries of Revenue and Public Works in the city of Beijing, Zhili exclusively used Manchu characters.

=== Ministry of Revenue and Ministry of Public Works ===
Mint mark	Möllendorff	Responsible ministry	Image
Manchu: ᠪᠣᠣ ᠴᡳᠣᠸᠠᠨ	Boo Ciowan	Ministry of Revenue (hùbù, 戶部), Beijing	
Manchu: ᠪᠣᠣ ᠶᡠᠸᠠᠨ	Boo Yuwan	Ministry of Public Works (gōngbù, 工部), Beijing	

=== Provincial mints ===
Mint mark (Traditional Chinese)	Mint mark (Simplified Chinese)	Issuing office	Image
同	同	Datong garrison, Shanxi	
福	福	Fuzhou, Fujian	
臨	临	Linqing garrison, Shandong	
東	东	Jinan, Shandong	
江	江	Nanchang, Jiangxi	
宣	宣	Xuanhua garrison, Zhili	
原	原	Taiyuan, Shanxi	
蘇	苏	Suzhou, Jiangsu	
薊	蓟	Jizhou garrison, Zhili	
昌	昌	Wuchang, Hubei	
甯	宁	Jiangning, Jiangsu	
河	河	Kaifeng, Henan	
南	南	Changsha, Hunan	
廣	广	Guangzhou, Guangdong	
浙	浙	Hangzhou, Zhejiang	
臺	台	Taiwan-Fu, Taiwan	
桂	桂	Guilin, Guangxi	
陝	陕	Xi'an, Shaanxi	
雲	云	Yunnan Province	
漳	漳	Zhangzhou, Fujian	
鞏	巩	Gongchang, Gansu	
西	西	Shanxi provincial mint	
寧	宁	Ningbo, Zhejiang	

== Commemorative issues ==
In 1713, a special Kangxi Tongbao (康熙通寶) cash coin was issued to commemorate the sixtieth birthday of the Kangxi Emperor, these bronze coins were produced with a special yellowish colour, and these cash coins believed to have "the powers of a charm" immediately when it entered circulation, this commemorative coin contains a slightly different version of the Hanzi symbol "熙", at the bottom of the cash, as this character would most commonly have a vertical line at the left part of it but did not have it, and the part of this symbol which was usually inscribed as "臣" has the middle part written as a "口" instead. Notably, the upper left area of the symbol "通" only contains a single dot as opposed of the usual two dots used during this era. Several myths were attributed to this coin over the following 300 years since it has been cast such as the myth that the coin was cast from molten down "golden" (brass) statues of the 18 disciples of the Buddha which earned this coin the nicknames "the Lohan coin" and "Arhat money" because the Kangxi Emperor was intimately involved with Christian missionaries and developed a contempt for Buddhism. These commemorative kāng xī tōng bǎo cash coins were given to children as yā suì qián (壓歲錢) during Chinese new year, some women wore them akin to how an engagement ring is worn today, and in rural Shanxi young men wore this special kāng xī tōng bǎo cash coin between their teeth like men from cities had golden teeth. Despite the myths surrounding this coin it was made from a copper-alloy and did not contain any gold but it was not uncommon for people to enhance the coin with gold leaf. According to David Hartill this myth was first reported around the year 1851 in China and attributes this to similar stories which were circulating about the "Bun" Kan'ei Tsūhō cash coins from Japan at the time.

== Kangxi Tongbao charms and poem coins ==
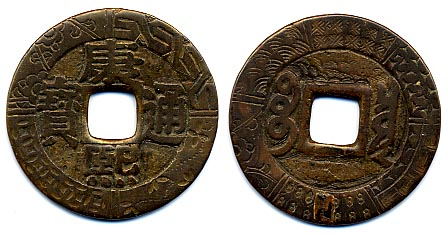
A Kangxi Tongbao (康熙通寶) charm or amulet.

Chinese poem coins (Traditional Chinese: 詩錢; Simplified Chinese: 诗钱; Pinyin: shī qián, alternatively 二十錢局名) were Chinese cash coins cast under the Kangxi Emperor, a Manchu Emperor known for his Chinese poetry skills and wrote the work "Illustrations of Plowing and Weaving" (耕織圖) in 1696. Under the Kangxi Emperor 23 mints operated at various times with many closing and reopening, the coins produced under the Kangxi Emperor all had the obverse inscription Kāng Xī Tōng Bǎo (康熙通寶). As the name Kangxi was composed of the characters meaning "health" (康) and "prosperous" (熙) the Kāng Xī Tōng Bǎo cash coins were already viewed as having auspicious properties by the Chinese people. As the Kāng Xī Tōng Bǎo cash coins were produced at various mints some people placed these coins together to form poems, even though many of these poems did not have any meaning they were composed in adherence to the rules of Classical Chinese poetry. These coins were always placed together to form the following poems:

Traditional Chinese	Pinyin
同福臨東江	tóng fú lín dōng jiāng
宣原蘇薊昌	xuān yuán sū jì chāng
南寧河廣浙	nán níng hé guǎng zhè
台桂陝雲漳	tái guì shǎn yún zhāng

It was arranged by a Chinese private coin collector using the different mint marks to form a type of a Chinese poetry during the Qianlong period and it has now become the favourite target of collection for many coin collectors in Mainland China and Taiwan.

According to an old Chinese superstition the strung "charm" of twenty coins also known as "set coins" (套子錢) only worked if all coins were genuine and this could be tested by placing them on a chicken-coop and if the cocks did not crow during the early morning. As carrying twenty coins together was seen as less than convenient new charms were being produced that had the ten of the twenty mint marks on each side of the coin, unlike the actual cash coins that they're based on these charms tend to have round holes in the middle and are also round in shape. Sometimes they were painted red as the colour red is viewed to be auspicious in Chinese culture. Sometimes these coins had obverse inscriptions wishing for good fortunes and the twenty mint marks on their reverse, these inscriptions include:

Traditional Chinese	Translation
金玉滿堂	"may gold and jade fill your halls."
大位高升	"may you be promoted to a high position."
五子登科	"may your five sons achieve great success in the imperial examinations."
福祿壽喜	"good fortune, emolument (official salary), longevity, and happiness."
吉祥如意	"may your good fortune be according to your wishes."

Kāng Xī Tōng Bǎo cash coins produced at the Ministry of Revenue and the Ministry of Public Works in the capital city of Beijing are excluded from these poems.

Because of the popularity of the Kangxi poem coins many later versions of the poem coins were made where the Kangxi era mint marks are used but other inscriptions such as the Yongzheng Tongbao, Daoguang Tongbao, Guangxu Tongbao, Etc. are used on the obverse.

Coin-swords made from Qing dynasty cash coins with the inscription Kangxi Tongbao are considered to be the most effective, this is because the reign of the Kangxi Emperor of the Qing dynasty lasted an entire 60-year cycle of the Chinese calendar and thus according to feng shui cash coins with this inscription represent "longevity".

== See also ==
- List of Chinese cash coins by inscription
