= List of mortuary customs =

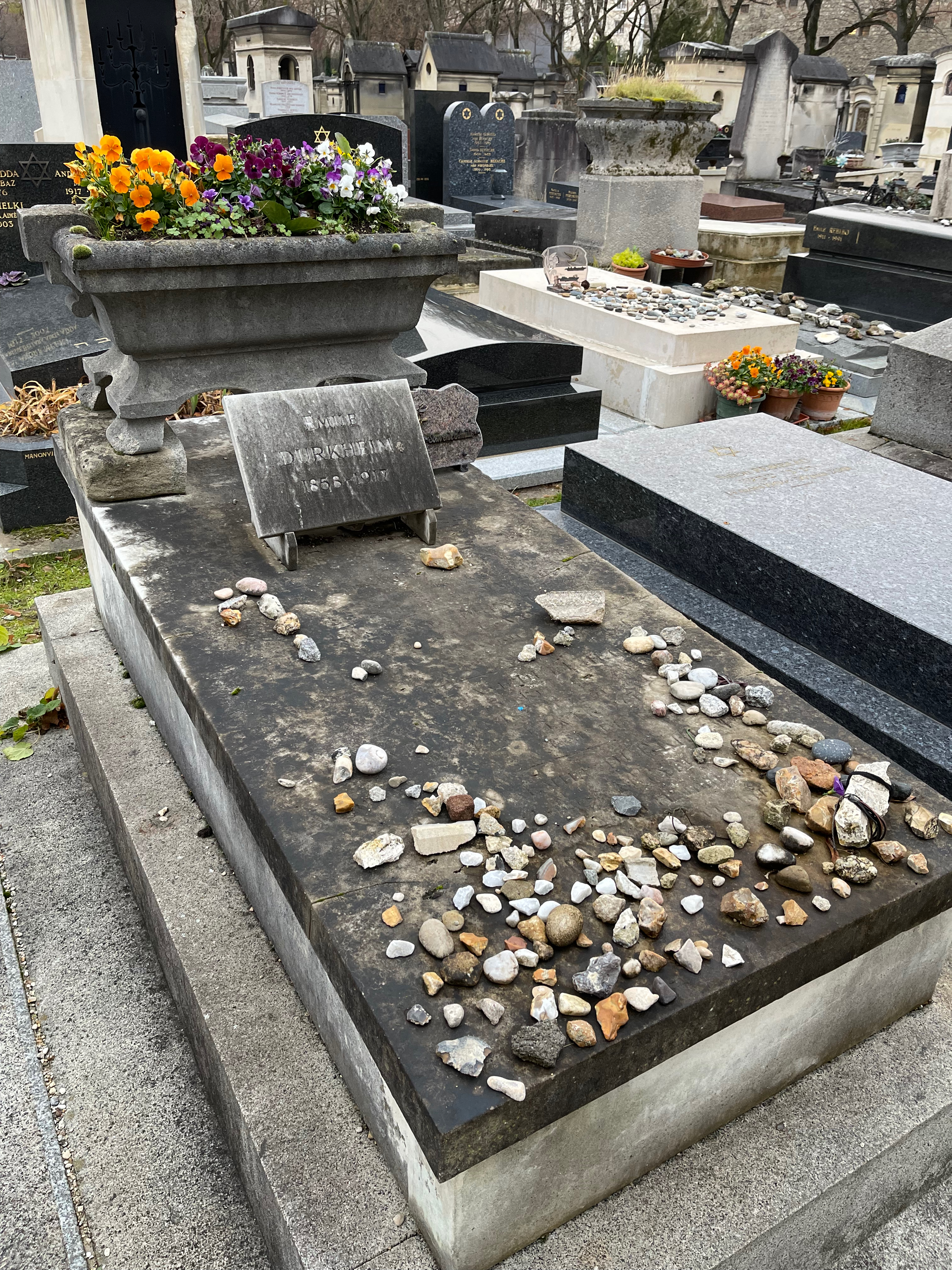
Visitation stones are placed on the tomb of Émile Durkheim, a Jewish custom.

== A ==
- Ablution in Christianity is a prescribed washing of part or all of the body or possessions, such as clothing or ceremonial objects, with the intent of purification or dedication.
- Ancient Egyptian funerary practices are an elaborate set of practices that they believed were necessary to ensure their immortality after death. These rituals included mummifying the body, casting magic spells, and burials with specific grave goods thought to be needed in the afterlife.
- Angelica vestis, in English and European antiquity, was a monastic garment that laymen wore a little before their death, that they might have the benefit of the prayers of the monks.

== B ==
- Beatification is a recognition accorded by the Catholic Church of a deceased person's entrance into Heaven.
- Bed burial is a type of burial in which the deceased person is buried in the ground, lying upon a bed.
- Burial at sea is the disposal of human remains in the ocean, normally from a ship or boat. It is regularly performed by navies, and is done by private citizens in many countries.
- Burial also known as interment or inhumation, is a method of final disposition whereby a dead body is placed into the ground, sometimes with objects.
- Burial mounds are mounds of earth and stones raised over a grave or graves.
- Burial tree is a tree or simple structure used for supporting corpses or coffins.

== C ==
- Canonization is the declaration of a deceased person as an officially recognized saint.
- Candlelight vigil is an outdoor assembly of people carrying candles, held after sunset in order to show support for a specific cause.
- Cemeteries is a place where the remains of dead people are buried or otherwise interred.
- Cenotaph is an empty tomb or a monument erected in honour of a person or group of people whose remains are elsewhere. It can also be the initial tomb for a person who has since been reinterred elsewhere. Although the vast majority of cenotaphs honour individuals, many noted cenotaphs are instead dedicated to the memories of groups of individuals, such as the lost soldiers of a country or of an empire.
- Chariot burial are tombs in which the deceased was buried together with their chariot, usually including their horses and other possessions.
- Chemamull are carved wooden statues, usually more than 2 metres (6 ft 7 in) tall, that represent the stylized body and head of a human being. Statues may have male or female features. The Mapuche used whole logs of either Nothofagus obliqua, a hardwood, or laurel for their chemamüll.
- Chinese burial money are Chinese imitations of currency that are placed in the grave of a person that is to be buried.
- Cippus is a low, round or rectangular pedestal set up by the Ancient Romans for purposes such as a milestone or a boundary post. The inscriptions on some cippi show that they were occasionally used as funeral memorials.
- Coins for the dead is a form of respect for the dead or bereavement. The practice began in ancient Greece Roman times when people thought the dead needed coins to pay ferryman to cross the river Styx. In modern times the practice has been observed in the United States and Canada: visitors leave coins on the gravestones of former military personnel.
- Cremation is a method of final disposition of a dead body through burning.
- Cryonics low-temperature freezing (usually at −196 °C or −320.8 °F or 77.1 K) and storage of a human corpse or severed head, with the speculative hope that resurrection may be possible in the future.

== D ==
- Day of the Dead is a holiday that involves family and friends gathering to pay respects and remember friends and family members who have died. These celebrations can take a humorous tone, as celebrants remember amusing events and anecdotes about the departed.
- Death mask is a likeness (typically in wax or plaster cast) of a person's face after their death, usually made by taking a cast or impression from the corpse.
- Dolmen is a type of single-chamber megalithic tomb, usually consisting of two or more vertical megaliths supporting a large flat horizontal capstone or "table". Most date from the early Neolithic (4000–3000 BC) and were sometimes covered with earth or smaller stones to form a tumulus. Small pad-stones may be wedged between the cap and supporting stones to achieve a level appearance.

== E ==
- Embalming chemicals are a variety of preservatives, sanitising and disinfectant agents, and additives used in modern embalming to temporarily prevent decomposition and restore a natural appearance for viewing a body after death.
- Excarnation the term excarnation (also known as defleshing) refers to the practice of removing the flesh and organs of the dead before burial.
- Eaves-drip burial is the medieval funerary custom in Britain of burying infants and young children next to building foundations in churchyard.

== F ==
- Funerary art is any work of art forming, or placed in, a repository for the remains of the dead.
- Funeral coin is used for coins issued on the occasion of the death of a prominent person, mostly a ruling prince or a coin-lord.
- Funeral games are athletic competitions held in honor of a recently deceased person.
- Funeral is a ceremony connected with the final disposition of a corpse, such as a burial or cremation, with the attendant observances.
- Funeral procession is a procession, usually in motor vehicles or by foot, from a funeral home or place of worship to the cemetery or crematorium.

== G ==
- Ghost bike is a bicycle roadside memorial, placed where a cyclist has been killed or severely injured
- Glorification may have several meanings in Christianity. From the Catholic canonization to the similar sainthood of the Eastern Orthodox Church to salvation in Christianity in Protestant beliefs, the glorification of the human condition can be a long and arduous process.

== H ==
- Hanging coffins are coffins which have been placed on cliffs. They are practiced by various cultures in China, Indonesia, and the Philippines.
- Headstone is a stele or marker, usually stone, that is placed over a grave. It is traditional for burials in the Christian, Jewish, and Muslim religions, among others. In most cases, it has the deceased's name, date of birth, and date of death inscribed on it, along with a personal message, or prayer, but may contain pieces of funerary art, especially details in stone relief. In many parts of Europe, insetting a photograph of the deceased in a frame is very common.
- Heart-burial is the practice of burying the heart separate from the body.
- Horse burial is the practice of burying a horse as part of the ritual of human burial, and is found among many Indo-European speaking peoples and others, including Chinese and Turkic peoples.

== K ==
- Keening is a traditional form of vocal lament for the dead in the Gaelic Celtic tradition, known to have taken place in Ireland and Scotland.

== M ==
- Ma'nene is the ritual practiced by the Torajan people (takes place each year in August), the bodies of the deceased are exhumed to be washed, groomed and dressed in new clothes.
- Memorials is an object which serves as a focus for the memory or the commemoration of something, usually an influential, deceased person or a historical, tragic event.
- Military funeral is a memorial or burial rite given by a country's military for a soldier, sailor, marine or airman who died in battle, a veteran, or other prominent military figures or heads of state.
- Missing man formation is a flypast of several aircraft done in honor of a deceased aviator in the armed forces.
- Moment of silence is a period of silent contemplation, prayer, reflection, or meditation.
- Mourning portraits is a portrait of a person who has recently died, usually shown on their deathbed, or lying in repose, displayed for mourners.
- Mourning warehouse a shop which sold goods for funerals and the elaborate mourning of the Victorian era.
- Mortuary house is any purpose-built structure, often resembling a normal dwelling in many ways, in which a dead body is buried.
- Mummy is a dead human or an animal whose soft tissues and organs have been preserved by either intentional or accidental exposure to chemicals. Mummies of humans and animals have been found on every continent.

== N ==
- National day of mourning is a day or days marked by mourning and memorial activities observed among the majority of a country's populace.
- Nefesh is a Semitic monument placed near a grave so as to be seen from afar.

== O ==
- Obelisk is a tall, four-sided, narrow tapering monument which ends in a pyramid-like shape or pyramidion at the top.
- Ossuary is a chest, box, building, well, or site made to serve as the final resting place of human skeletal remains.

== P ==
- Pallbearer is one of several participants who help carry the casket at a funeral.
- Posthumous citizenship is a form of honorary citizenship granted by countries to immigrants or other foreigners after their deaths.
- Posthumous marriage is a marriage in which at least one of the participating members is deceased.
- Posthumous name is an honorary name given to royalty, nobles, and sometimes others, in East Asia after the person's death, and is used almost exclusively instead of one's personal name or other official titles
- Posthumous promotion is an advancement in rank or position in the case of a person who is dead. Posthumous promotions are most often associated with the military
- Putridarium Is a temporary burial place
- Pyre, also known as a funeral pyre, is a structure, usually made of wood, for burning a body as part of a funeral rite or execution. As a form of cremation, a body is placed upon or under the pyre, which is then set on fire.

== R ==
- Repatriation and reburial of human remains is a current issue in archaeology, centering on ethical issues and cultural sensitivities regarding human remains of long-deceased ancestors which have ended up in museums and other institutions.
- Rasam Pagri is a social ceremony, prevalent in Punjab and Rajasthanis in the Indian subcontinent. The ceremony is conducted upon the death of the eldest male member in a family, in which the eldest surviving male member of the family ties a turban (pagri) on his head in the presence of the extended family or clan.
- Requiem A mass for the dead
- Riderless horse is a single horse or motorcycle, without a rider, and with boots reversed in the stirrups, which sometimes accompanies a funeral procession. The horse follows the caisson carrying the casket.

== S ==
- Sarcophagus is a box-like funeral receptacle for a corpse, most commonly carved in stone, and usually displayed above ground, though it may also be buried.
- Sati (practice) is a historical Hindu practice in which a widow sacrificed herself by sitting atop her deceased husband's funeral pyre.
- Secondary burial (German: Nachbestattung or Sekundärbestattung), or double funeral.
- Sky burial is a funeral practice in which a human corpse is placed on a mountaintop to decompose while exposed to the elements or to be eaten by scavenging animals, especially carrion birds.
- Ship burial is a burial in which a ship or boat is used either as the tomb for the dead and the grave goods, or as a part of the grave goods itself.
- Shrine is a sacred or holy space dedicated to a specific deity, ancestor, hero, martyr, saint, daemon, or similar figure of respect, wherein they are venerated or worshipped.
- Stele Steles have also been used to publish laws and decrees, to record a ruler's exploits and honors, to mark sacred territories or mortgaged properties, as territorial markers, as the boundary steles of Akhenaton at Amarna,

== T ==
- Three-volley salute is a ceremonial act performed at military funerals and sometimes also police funerals.
- Tomb is a repository for the remains of the dead. It is generally any structurally enclosed interment space or burial chamber, of varying sizes. Placing a corpse into a tomb can be called immurement, and is a method of final disposition, as an alternative to cremation or burial.

== V ==
- Veneration of the dead is a form of ritual worship or veneration towards the souls of the dead.
- Visitation stones are small stones placed by people who visit Jewish graves in an act of remembrance or respect for the deceased. They are significant in Jewish bereavement practices.

== W ==
- Wake (ceremony) is a social gathering associated with death, usually held before a funeral.

== See also ==
- Death and culture
- List of ways people dishonor the dead
- List of types of funerary monument
- Martyr
