= Chinese burial money =

Historic Chinese funerary ritual

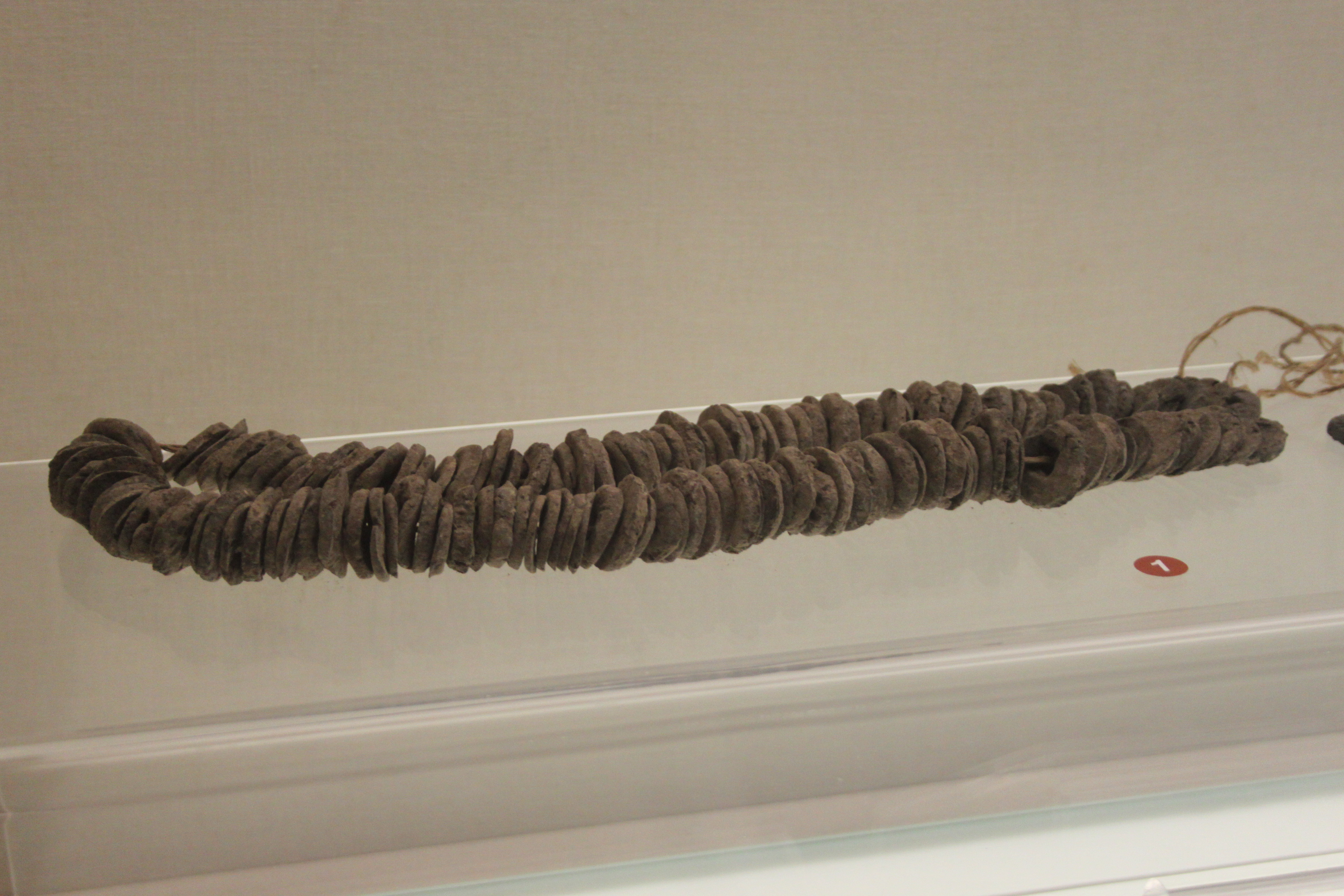
A string of clay Ban Liang (半兩) cash coins discovered at the Mawangdui site in Changsha, Hunan

Chinese burial money (traditional Chinese: 瘞錢; simplified Chinese: 瘗钱; pinyin: yì qián) a.k.a. dark coins (traditional Chinese: 冥錢; simplified Chinese: 冥钱; pinyin: míng qián) are Chinese imitations of currency that are placed in the grave of a person that is to be buried. The practice dates to the Shang dynasty when cowrie shells were used, in the belief that the money would be used in the afterlife as a bribe to Yan Wang (also known as Yama) for a more favourable spiritual destination. The practice changed to replica currency to deter grave robbers, and these coins and other imitation currencies were referred to as clay money (泥錢) or earthenware money (陶土幣).

Chinese burial money has been discovered dating as far back as 1300 BCE and remained popular throughout Chinese history until the advent of joss paper and hell money during the late 19th century CE.

== History ==
Burial money was modeled after the many different types of ancient Chinese coinages, and earlier forms of burial money tended to be actual money. Graves that were dated to the Shang dynasty period have been discovered that contain thousands of cowrie shells, for example, the Fu Hao-mu, dating to about the year 1200 BCE, was discovered containing 6,900 cowry shells. Chinese graves dating to the Warring States period are found containing contemporary coinages buried as funerary objects such as spade money, knife money, ring-shaped coins, ant-nose coins, and Ban Liang cash coins. But as the presence of real money and other objects of value would attract the attention of potential grave robbers, the Chinese started to manufacture clay imitations of real money. This was done as the contemporary Chinese believed that if the grave was robbed then the spirit of the deceased person who laid inside of the tomb was disturbed by these robbers and the money that was formerly located in the grave that was meant to ensure his or her comfort in the afterlife was now gone, making their afterlife less comfortable.

Chinese burial money has been discovered made from stones and bones (along with cowrie shells) in the earliest forms, later forms include thin metallic imitations of circulation currency during the Spring and Autumn period. The imitation metal money found in these ancient tombs ended to be thin and fragile, and were typically made of lead and bronze. Initially archaeologists believed that imitations of currencies were only used by the poor, but the discovery of imitation money in the tombs of the wealthy had changed this view.

The Chinese custom of burying the deceased with coins can be compared to the ancient Greek and Roman customs of burying people with a coin to pay with a passage to the underworld. In the Chinese afterlife burial coins could be used to purchase either less or no punishment for bad karma, or even for the purchase of luxury items.

== "Laid to Rest" burial charms ==
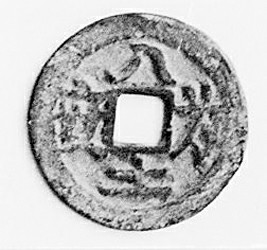
A cash coin-shaped "Laid to Rest" (入土为安) burial charm

Chinese "Laid to Rest" burial charms are bronze funerary charms or coins usually found in graves. They measure from 2.4 to 2.45 centimetres (0.94 to 0.96 in) in diameter with a thickness of 1.3 to 1.4 millimetres (0.051 to 0.055 in) and they contain the obverse inscription rù tǔ wéi ān (入土为安) which means "to be laid to rest", while the reverse is blank. These coins were mostly found in graves dating from the late Qing dynasty period, though one was found in a coin hoard of Northern Song dynasty coins. The wéi is written using a simplified Chinese character (为) rather than the traditional Chinese version of the character (為). These coins are often excluded from numismatic reference books on Chinese coinage or talismans due to many taboos, as they were placed in the mouths of dead people and are considered unlucky and disturbing, and are undesired by most collectors.

These existed some controversy to the attribution of this Chinese burial coin, this is because the wei is written using the simplified Chinese character "为" instead of the traditional Chinese variant "為". The argument used to dispute its typical attribution to the Manchu Qing dynasty period was that because simplified Chinese characters did not exist in a standardised form prior to their introduction by the Communist government of the People's Republic of China in the year 1956. This hypothesis has been debunked as research into the simplified form of this particular Chinese character has shown, however, that the simplified variant of it has existed at least from the time of the Ming dynasty period ending the controversy surrounding its origins.

== Clay burial money ==
Clay money (泥錢; 泥钱; ní qián), or earthenware money (陶土幣; 陶土币; táo tǔ bì), was a special type of Chinese burial money that started appearing sometime during the Han dynasty period. Clay money was created as an alternative to burying actual money with the deceased in the hopes of preventing the grave to be "disturbed" by graverobbers.

In the book Han Material Culture written by the Sinologist Sophia-Karin Psarras it is stated that any representation of real life currency was considered legal tender that could be used as a medium of exchange in the afterlife. This belief helped the transition of using real bronze, silver, and / or gold money in Chinese graves with surrogate forms of money made of clay. As these imitations of money made from clay had no actual value in "the world of the living" they would deter grave robbers from breaking in and "disturbing" the dead. Because clay money is so cheap to produce it was used by both the wealthy and impoverished, as the poor could afford to buy these clay imitations of actual coins to bury with their deceased relatives.

Clay money for funerary uses could be based on "low money" or "low currency" (下幣), such as copper-alloy cash coins, or on "high money" or "high currency" (上幣). "High currency" is a term that referred to silver and gold currencies that were produced during the Warring States, Qin dynasty, and Han dynasty periods. While initially the aristocracy tended to buried with genuine specimens of "high currency", later clay versions of these coinages were also produced.

=== Clay cowrie shell money ===
Clay cowrie shell money (泥貝幣; 泥贝币; ní bèi bì) is often found the graves of the wealthy, sometimes alongside real money. Clay cowrie shell money are inspired by the earliest money in the monetary history of China.

=== Clay versions of State of Chu gold plate money ===
Clay versions of the Warring States era Kingdom of Chu gold plate money (泥「郢稱」(楚國黃金貨幣); 泥"郢称"(楚国黄金货币); ní "yǐng chēng" ( chǔ guó huáng jīn huò bì )) are sometimes found buried in tombs of the late Zhou dynasty era, known as the Warring States period and even during later periods such as the Han dynasty. At the Mawangdui archaeological site over 300 pieces of this clay replicas of Ying Yuan were discovered.

=== Clay cash coins ===
Cash coins had a special significance for the ancient Chinese in reference to their concept of the afterlife. The ancient Chinese believed that cash coins served as a sort of cosmic map for the deceased to ascent to the heavens. In the ancient Chinese world view the earth was square while the heavens were round. Because of these beliefs cash coin themed objects are commonly found in tombs dating to the Han dynasty period as well as bronze trees which are laden with either real or imitations of Wu Zhu cash coins, which are sometimes known as shengxianshu ("immortal ascension trees"), and cash coin patterns are also found in the clay directional tiles of tombs.

Clay cash coins are also referred to as Tuqian (土錢) meaning "dirt cash".

==== Clay Ban Liang cash coins ====
Specimens of clay Ban Liang (泥半兩; 泥半两; ní bàn liǎng) cash coins were uncovered at the Mawangdui site located in Changsha, Hunan. The Mawangdui site dates to the early Han dynasty period and the clay Ban Liang cash coins were discovered strung together. At Tomb No. 1, which is the resting place of Xin Zhui (the Marquise of Dai), around 100,000 clay Ban Liang cash coins were recovered from the site. These clay Ban Liang cash coins were located in 40 different containers with each container holding between approximately 2500 and 3000 imitation coins.

The burial of clay Ban Liang cash coins followed that closely of earlier burials of real circulation coins, as around 100,000 Ban Liang cash coins were discovered inside of the tomb of Liu Fei, Prince of Jiangdu.

==== Clay Wu Zhu cash coins ====
Clay Wu Zhu (traditional Chinese: 泥五銖; simplified Chinese: 泥五铢; pinyin: ní wǔ zhū) cash coins are sometimes discovered in graves and other burial sites which date from the Han dynasty onwards throughout the 700 years that cash coins with this legend (or inscription) were produced. Clay Wu Zhu cash coins are quite frequently discovered in Han dynasty period graves, for example a Han dynasty period burial site located near the city of Shanghai's Fuquanshan (福泉山) site was discovered containing several hundreds of clay Wu Zhu cash coins inside of it.

According to the American art historian Susan Erickson (of the Department of Art History, University of Michigan) in her 1994 article "Money Trees of the Eastern Han Dynasty", the Wu Zhu cash coin had special significance for the dead in China, as the Hanzi character "Zhu" (銖) could in this context also refer to the trunk of the 300 li (around 124,740 meters or 77.51 miles) tall fusang tree which in ancient Chinese mythology is considered to be an auspicious symbol that helps to guide the deceased on their journey to the heavens and eventually immortality in the afterlife.

Over time the Chinese view of what Wu Zhu cash coins meant for the deceased evolved. Over time the Wu Zhu cash coins began to play a more down-to-earth role as the way that the Chinese saw the afterlife also changed, the Chinese began to believe that the afterlife was very similar to the realm of the living and that the deceased would also have a need for money. The clay imitations of money that were placed inside of the tombs could therefore be used by the dead to pay debts and taxes that are owed to the otherworldly (or "hell") government in the afterlife.

Prior to clay Wu Zhu cash coins being used real Wu Zhu's were still being buried. In 2015 Chinese archeologists uncovered 10 tonnes of bronze Wu Zhu cash coins from the Western Han dynasty (or around 2 million cash coins) alongside over ten thousand of other iron, bronze, and gold items in the Haihunhou cemetery near Nanchang, Jiangxi, among the other uncovered items were bamboo slips, wood tablets, as well as jade objects. As these Wu Zhu cash coins were strung in strings of 1000 pieces this proved that the practice of stringing cash coins per 1000 did not first happen during the Tang dynasty as was previously thought but actually six hundred years earlier. By 2017 the cash coins unearthed at the site had numbered to around 2,000,000 Wu Zhu cash coins, on 9 January 2017 iFeng.com reported that a rare Wu Zhu cash coin with a character that was found to have been carved upside down.

==== Clay Daquan Wushi cash coins ====
Clay Daquan Wushi cash coins (泥大泉五十; ní dà quán wǔ shí), based on Wang Mang period cash coins with the same inscription, have been found in burial sites and tombs dating to the restored (or "Eastern") Han dynasty period. At a Han period tomb in Henan over 20 specimens of clay Daquan Wushi cash coins were discovered.

==== Clay Kaiyuan Tongbao cash coins ====
Clay Kaiyuan Tongbao (泥開元通寶; 泥开元通宝; ní kāiyuán tōng bǎo ) cash coins are at times discovered in Chinese tombs that date back to the Tang and Song dynasty periods.

During the Tang dynasty period clay coins were not exclusively produced as burial coins, as there was an area that was declared to be a form of "autonomous region" in what is today known as Hebei that at the time was under the dominion of Liu Rengong, a local warlord. Thus autonous region manufactured both clay cash coins and iron cash coins, Liu Rengong would then force the inhabitants of his territory to trade in their older bronze cash coins for these new low intrinsic value cash coins. This experiment is a rare case in the monetary history of China where clay cash coins were officially produced by a government for circulation and not exclusively for funeral use.

==== Clay burial coins based on later cash coins ====
Clay burial coins that imitate the cash coins of later periods are commonly found in more recent Chinese tombs.

Clay burial coins which imitate both Song dynasty period and Jurchen Jin dynasty period cash coins have been discovered in a tomb that is located in the province of Shanxi. Khitan Liao dynasty period tombs sometimes include clay imitations of Liao dynasty cash coins, such as clay versions of the extremely rare Tianchao Wanshun (天朝萬順). Such burial coins are not exclusively found in tombs but also at pagodas. Clay Liao dynasty cash coins were discovered in the foundation of a Liao dynasty period pagoda, these clay coins inscriptions such as Baoning Tongbao (保寧通寶) and Dakang Tongbao (大康通寶).

During the Manchu Qing dynasty, which reigned over China until the early 20th century, clay versions of cash coins were continued to be produced as funerary money, for example clay versions of Qianlong Tongbao (乾隆通寶) cash coins are sometimes found in tombs and other burial sites dating to the Qing dynasty period.

== Paper burial money ==
Paper burial money dates back to around the mid 3rd century CE. These early forms of Joss paper were paper imitations of goods or coinage, intended as offerings to the dead. They were intended to be used in the Chinese underworld known as dei yuk (which Christian missionaries translated as "Hell") where Yan Wang would judge the souls of those that appeared before him in his underworld court. Dei yuk in Chinese mythology is not a place where the deceased suffer permanently but a place where the souls of the dead can "burn off" their bad karma before they are allowed to reincarnate into a higher plane of existence.

== Jinbing as burial money ==
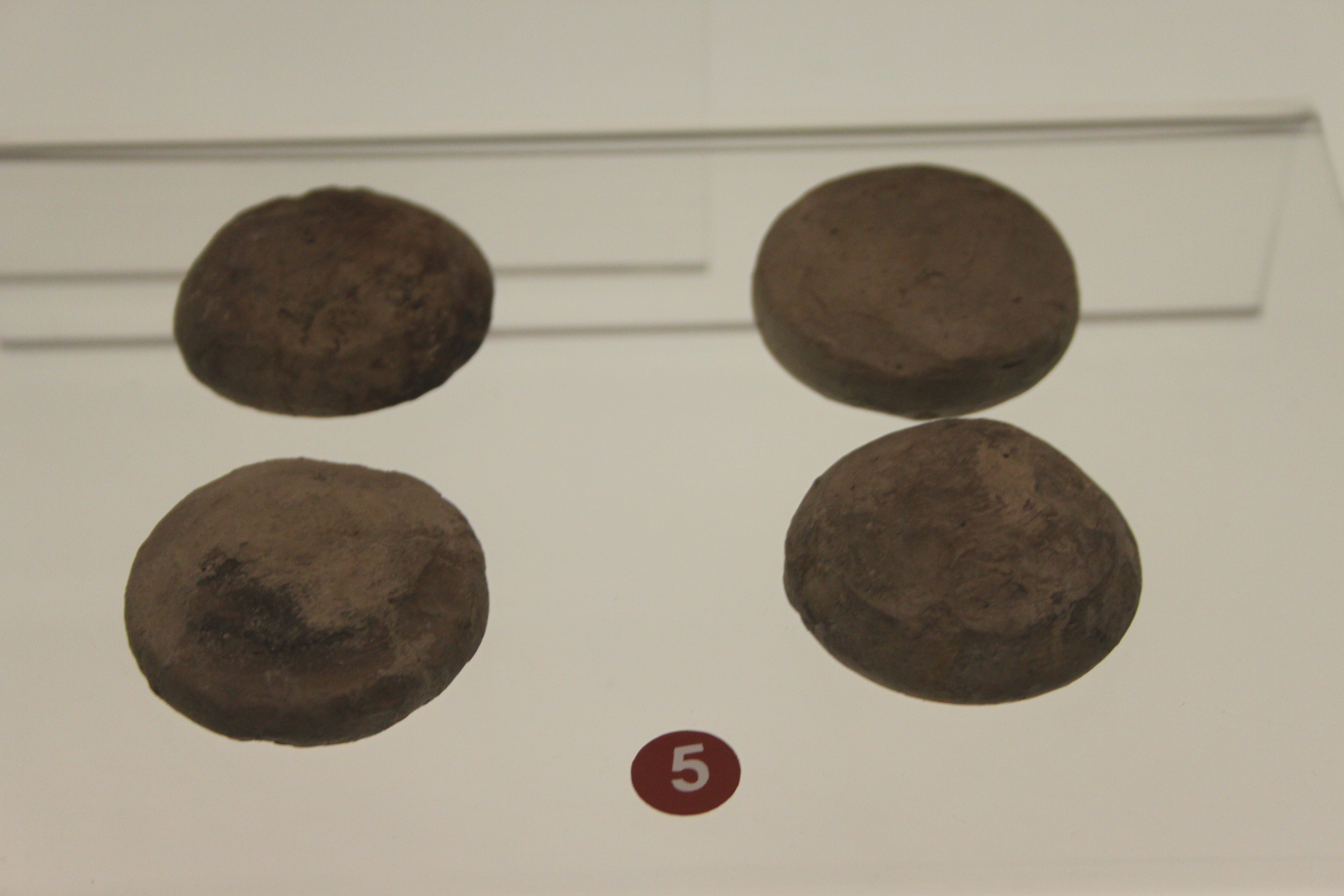
Clay replicas of Jinbing (金餅) at the Mawangdui archaeological site that located in Changsha, Hunan

During the Western Han dynasty period it is estimated that over 1,000,000 catties (斤), which is over 248 metric tons, of gold currencies and coinages was in circulation in China at the time. Among the gold currencies that circulated during the Western Han dynasty period was the Jinbing (traditional Chinese: 金餅; simplified Chinese: 金饼; pinyin: jīn bǐng), which was shaped as a "cake" or "cookie" and are variously referred to in English as a "gold pie", "gold cake", "gold biscuit", "gold bing ingot", "gold button ingot", etc. These Jinbing tend to weigh between 210 grams and 250 grams with most weighing about 248 grams or one Han dynasty period catty and had a gold content of between 97 and 99% gold. A single Jinbing was equivalent to about 10,000 cash coins.

Han dynasty Jinbing can display Chinese characters which have been identified as reading 齊 (qí), 土 (tǔ), 長 (cháng), 阮 (ruǎn), 吉 (jí), 馬 (mǎ), 租 (zū), 千 (qiān), 金 (jīn), 王 (wáng), and "V". Other Chinese characters found on Jinbing require further research to be deciphered. Clay imitations of Jinbing (陶質"金餅"; 陶质"金饼"; táo zhì "jīn bǐng"), or mingqi (冥器; míng qì), are also at times found in tombs that date to the Han dynasty period. Like the actual Jinbing, some clay imitations also feature Chinese characters at the bottom. Some inscriptions that have been found on clay Jinbing include feng nian tian (豐年田; "fields of bountiful harvest") and Zhiqian Baiwan (直錢百萬; "has a nominal value of 1,000,000 cash coins").

In the Western world clay imitations of Jinbing have in the past been mistakenly misidentified as "glazed plates of food".

== Money trees ==
Chinese money trees (搖錢樹; 摇钱树; yáo qián shù), or shengxianshu, ("immortal ascension trees"), are tree-like assemblies of charms, with the leaves made from numismatic charm replicas of cash coins. These money trees should not be with coin trees which are a by-product of the manufacture of cash coins, but due to their similarities it is thought by some experts that they may have been related. Various legends from China dating to the Three Kingdoms period mention a tree that if shaken would cause coins to fall from its branches. Money trees as a charm have been found in Southwest Chinese tombs from the Han dynasty, and are believed to have been placed there to help guide the dead to the afterlife and provide them with monetary support. According to one myth, a farmer watered the money tree seed with his sweat and watered its sapling with his blood, after which the mature tree provided eternal wealth; this implies a moral that one can only become wealthy through their own toil. Literary sources claim that the origin of the money tree lies with the Chinese word for "copper" (銅; tóng) which is pronounced similar to the word for "the Paulownia tree" (桐; tóng). The leaves of the Paulownia become yellow in autumn and take on the appearance of gold or bronze cash coins. Chen Shou (陳壽) mentions in the Records of the Three Kingdoms that a man named Bing Yuan (邴原) walked upon a string of cash coins while strolling and, unable to discover the owner, hung it in a nearby tree; other passersby noticed this string and began hanging coins in the tree with the assumption that it was a holy tree and made wishes for wealth and luck. The earliest money trees, however, date to the Han dynasty in present-day Sichuan and a Taoist religious order named the Way of the Five Pecks of Rice. Archeoloigsts uncovered money trees as tall as 1.98 metres (6 ft 6 in), decorated with many strings of cash coins, little bronze dogs, bats, Chinese deities, elephants, deer, phoenixes, and dragons, with a bronze frame and a base of pottery. Both the inscriptions and calligraphy found on Chinese money trees match those of contemporary Chinese cash coins, which typically featured replicas of Wu Zhu (五銖) coins during the Han dynasty while those from the Three Kingdoms period had inscriptions such as "Liang Zhu" (兩銖).

== Silk burial money ==
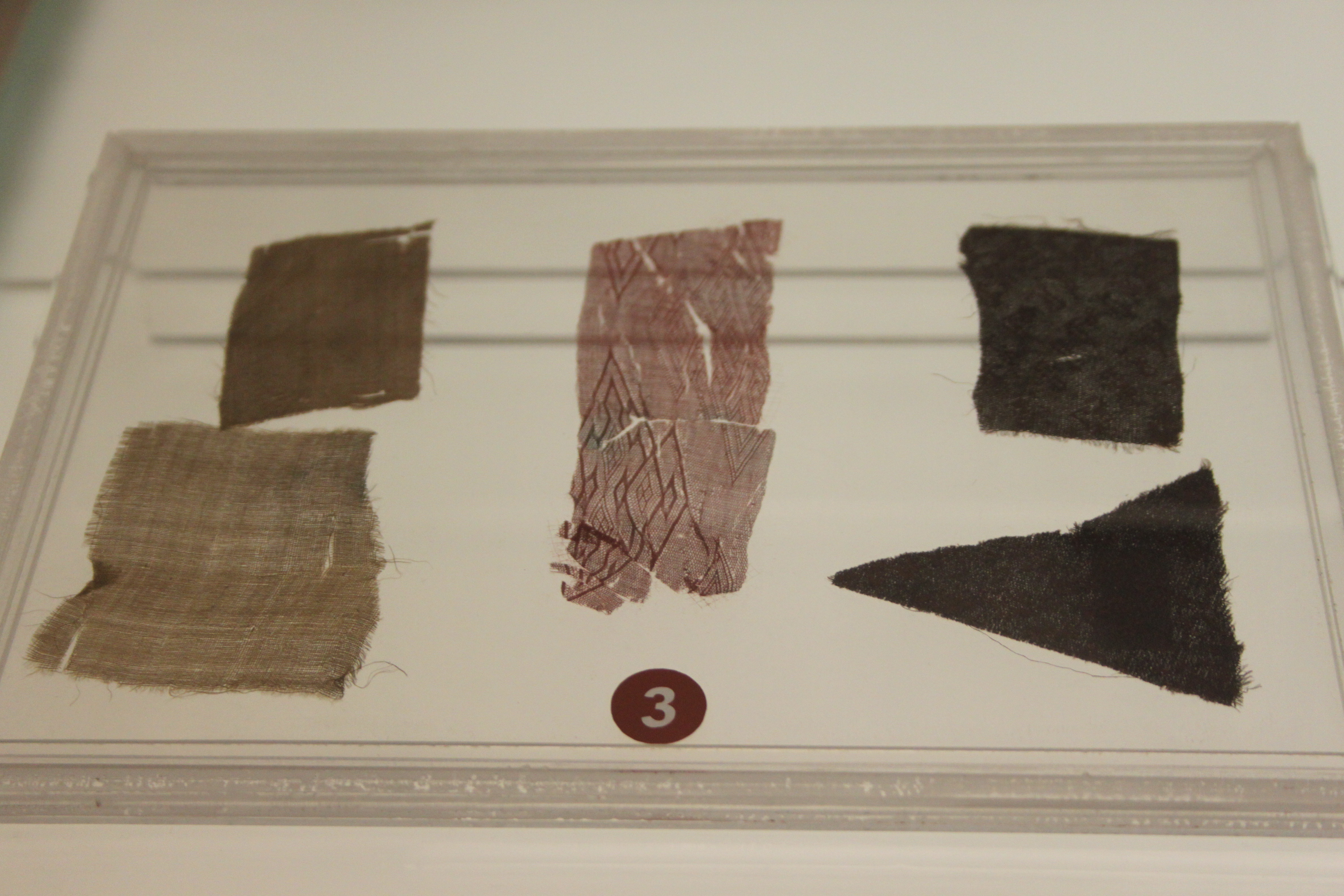
Silk funerary money discovered at Tomb No. 1 (the tomb of Xin Zhui) at the Mawangdui archaeological site in Changsha, Hunan

Silk funerary money (絲織品做的冥幣; 丝织品做的冥币; sī zhī pǐn zuò de míng bì) has been uncovered in tombs and other burial sites dating to the Han dynasty period. Silk fabric was considered to be a valuable form of commodity in China during ancient and imperial times and bolts of silk could also be used as a type of currency because of its high market value. The Silk funerary money that was recovered from Tomb No. 1 (the tomb of Xin Zhui) at the Mawangdui archaeological site. The silk funerary money that was recovered from the Mawangdui site was moved to be on display at the Hunan Provincial Museum, as of March 2015.

Because of this discovery, it is now believed by some Chinese archaeologists that the Warring States period State of Chu's rather distinctive looking sheet form of gold coinage, which in the modern era is known as Ying Yuan, with the closely linked small squares that might have in fact been inspired by this ancient type of Chinese silk money. This hypothesis linking the silk currency to the Chu gold coinage would further explain the reason why the clay imitation version (or burial variants) of the Chu State Ying Yuan that has been uncovered in tombs have a surface design that looks like the fabric of clothing.

== In Korea and Vietnam ==
The Chinese customs of burial money has also been observed by other Chinese cultured countries like Korea and Vietnam. Examples include Wang Mang's Xin dynasty era hwacheon (貨泉, 화천) cash have been unearthed in tombs in modern Korea there is minor evidence that these coins might have been used for the international trade of the time. And a Tây Sơn dynasty cash coin issued under Nguyễn Nhạc was found inside of the tomb of Thoại Ngọc Hầu and his two wives. This discovery is considered significant because Thoại Ngọc Hầu was a high-ranking Nguyễn dynasty official and as Tây Sơn dynasty coinage was banned from circulating by the Nguyễn government.

== Collectability and taboo ==
Chinese burial coins are typically not included in Chinese coin catalogues. While Chinese burial coins are sometimes referred to as "charms" they are not included in Chinese charm catalogues either. It seems that because of many cultural reasons that almost nobody wants to have these types of coins in their collections. Chinese burial coins that resemble cash coins have at times been described as "really scary" and "horrifying" by Chinese coin collectors.

Many Chinese coin collectors state that they would not buy or even own a burial coin because of their association with death and the deceased. This may be because these burial coins were at times "put into the mouth of the deceased" during the Chinese burial ritual or burial. Superstitious coin collectors may also claim that they should be "thrown away because they are unlucky" because of their macabre origins and uses.

== Modern influence ==
After the imperial period ended Chinese and Vietnamese burial and ritual customs have changed, it became uncommon for both actual and imitations of currency to be buried together with deceased individuals. Today it is more common for hell money to be ritualistically burned as offerings for the dead to use in the afterlife. These modern imitations of banknotes are supposedly issued by the Bank of Hell, the central bank of the afterlife.

The critical role of spirit money is to repay the debts of the ancestors of those burning the spirit banknotes. The belief is that the spirit of the deceased must pay its mystical debt that it has accumulated over their life. According to John McCreery in the 1990 article "Why Don't We See Some Real Money Here?: Offerings in Chinese Religion" published in the Journal of Chinese Religions 18 the burning of a large quantity of spirit money is believed to can make the difference how severely someone gets punished in the afterlife.

Despite the changed customs the basic concern remains the financial well-being of those that have died in the afterlife. Hell banknotes that are burned at modern Chinese and Vietnamese funerals have hyperinflated denominations, which can be as high as $10,000 to $5,000,000,000, or even higher. High denominations like these were also at times used with the ancient custom of clay burial money, such as a clay Jinbing having a nominal value of a million cash coins in the afterlife. When modern Hell Money when introduced during the late 1800s their denominations were roughly equal to that of the contemporary circulating banknotes, but over time their denominations have exponentially increased.

One hypothesis about the current situation where Hell Money have such high denomination states that it expanded to keep pace with the hyperinflation that occurred in China during the 1940s in the wake of World War II and that unlike the actual Chinese yuan, the denominations of Hell Money never declined, even after the Chinese economy was brought back under control following the surrender of Japan and a series of monetary reforms. The denominations of Hell Money and modern Renminbi differ greatly indicating that the value of money in the afterlife may not be equivalent to that used by the living. A writer at HK Magazine noted that either the inflation in the afterlife is rampant, "or the cost of unliving [is] ridiculously high".

== See also ==
- Cash coins in art
- Charon's obol
- Coins for the dead
- List of coin hoards in China
- List of coin hoards in Vietnam
- List of ways people honor the dead
- Visitation stones
- Zhizha
