= List of types of funerary monument =

This is a list of types of funerary monument, a physical structure that commemorates a deceased person or a group, in the latter case usually those whose deaths occurred at the same time or in similar circumstances. It differs from a basic tomb or cemetery in that while it may or may not contain the body of the deceased, its primary purpose is not simply to house remains, but to serve as a visible reminder of the dead for the living. It often features inscriptions (epitaphs) or funerary art.

Commemorative

- Headstone
  - Scottish gravestones
- Cenotaph (empty tomb)
- Mortuary house
  - Mausoleum
  - Catacombs
  - Pyramid
- Pillar tomb
- Heroon, herõon or heroum
- Sarcophagus (ornate types, otherwise being any stone-built receptacle)
- Recumbent effigy
- Rock-cut tombs in ancient Israel
- Stone ship
- Church monuments
  - English church monuments
  - Ledger stone
  - Monumental brass
  - Funerary hatchment
- Memorial cross
- War memorial
- Roadside memorial
- "Eternal flame"

Cultural precursors to burial/cremation

- Mortuary enclosure
- Ancient Egyptian funerary practices of the wealthy included the per nefer, house of beauty

== See also ==
- Memorial
  - Memorial bench
  - Commemorative plaque
- Funerary art
