= Palmbaumtaler =

German coins from the 17th century

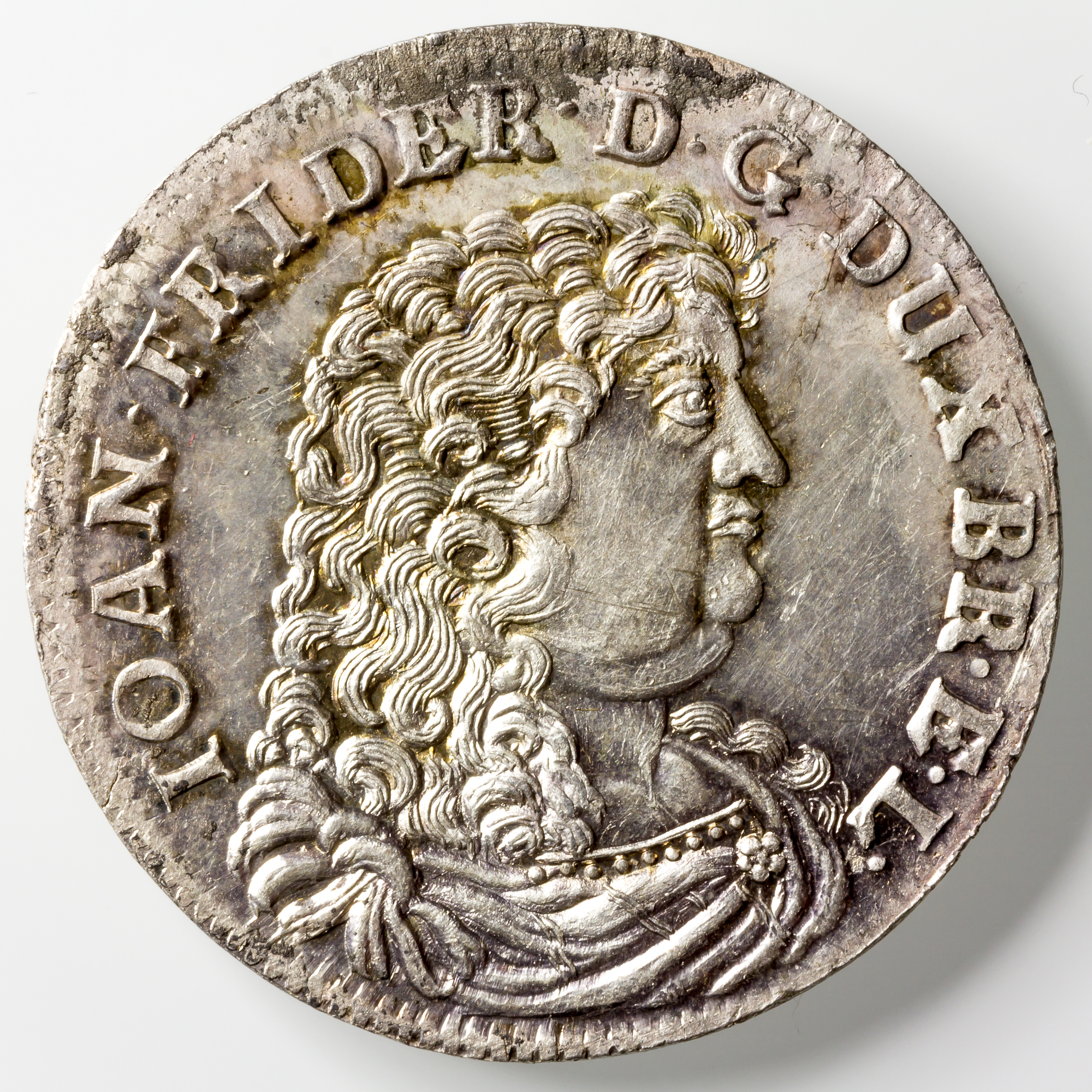
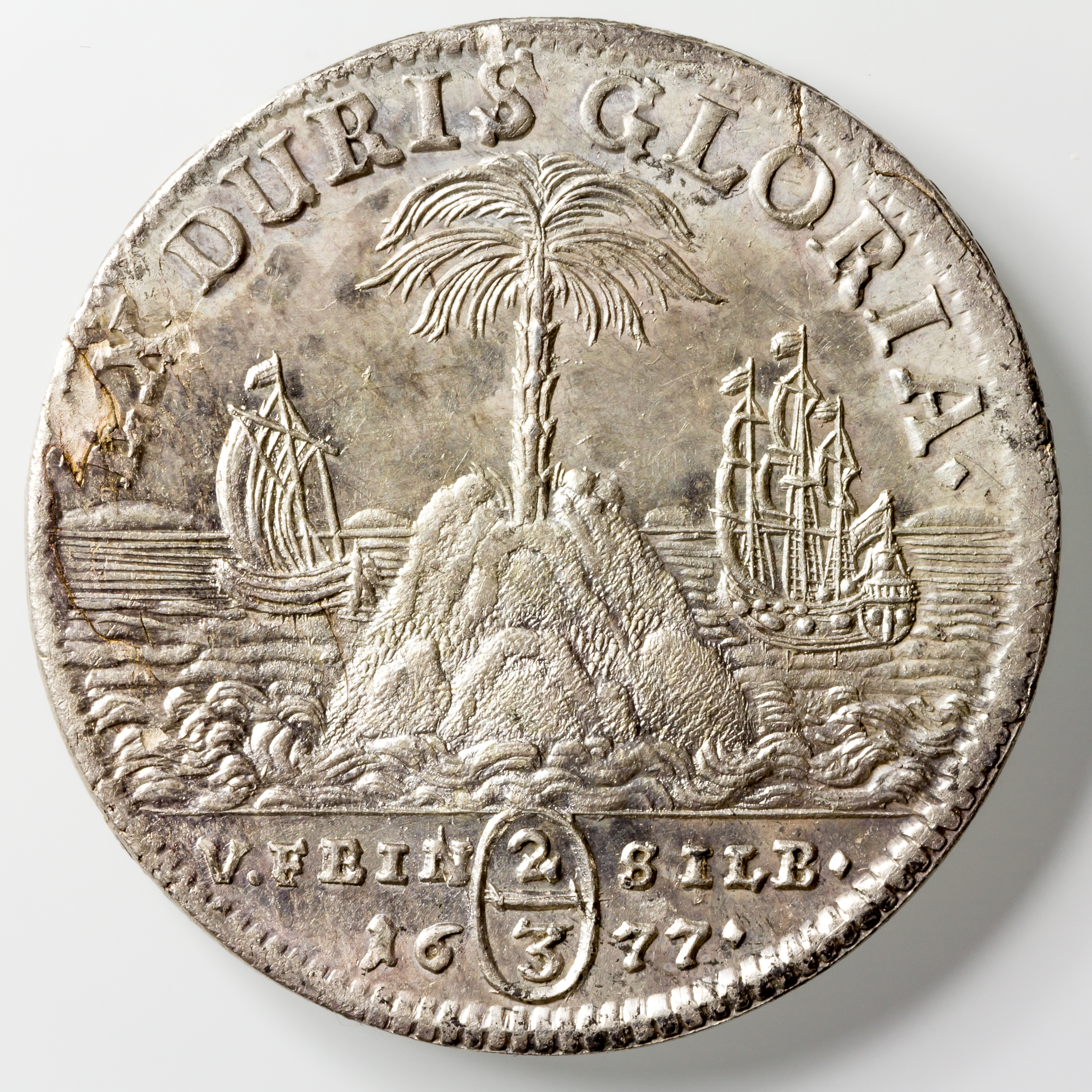
2/3 Thaler („Palmbaumgulden“), John Frederick, Duke of Brunswick-Lüneburg 1677 (Welter 1728)

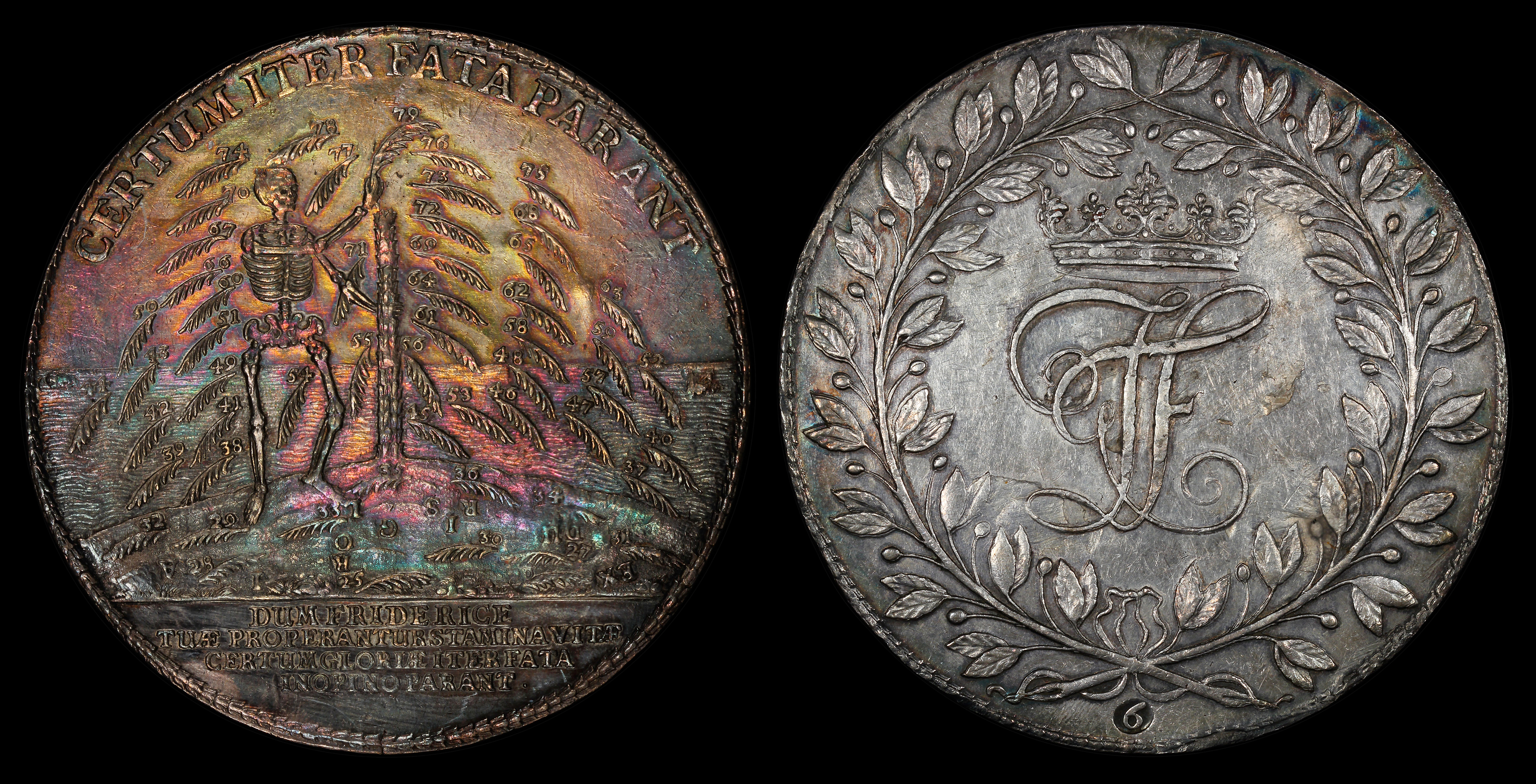
6 Sterbethaler John Frederick, Duke of Brunswick-Lüneburg († 1679); obv.: monogram JF in laurel wreath, rev.: Death as a skeleton, breaking the fronds off a palm tree (We. 1692)

Palmbaumtaler (or Palmbaumgulden) are coins which were issued by several northern German states during the 17th century, that all share a palm tree (German: Palmbaum) as a common motif. The palm was chosen because it was considered a symbol of strength and resilience.

Since the coins were issued by semi-independent states, each state adjusted the design. For example, the palm tree coins issued by the Princes of Waldeck and the Abbey of Fulda included a stone near the tree. Those from Prince John Frederick of Brunswick-Calenberg show a tree on an island amidst the sea, flanked by two ships. The Brunswick-Calenberg coins were issued in denominations of 2/3 thaler, 1/3 thaler and 24 Mariengroschen.

Even among coins issued by the same state the image, location and spelling of the legend may change, because the dies used for the coins were all handmade.
