= List of practices considered disrespectful towards deceased persons =

The following is a list of practices considered disrespectful towards deceased persons:

- Body snatching is the secret removal of corpses from burial sites. A common purpose of body snatching, especially in the 19th century, was to sell the corpses for dissection or anatomy lectures in medical schools.
- Damnatio memoriae Latin phrase meaning "condemnation of memory", indicating that a deceased person is to be excluded from official accounts.
- Decanonization is the removal of a person's name from the calendar of saints; the opposite of canonization.
- Desecration of graves involves intentional acts of vandalism or destruction in places where humans are interred and includes grave sites and grave markers.
  - Urinating on someone's grave is a form of grave desecration.
- Gibbeting is any instrument of public execution (including guillotine, executioner's block, impalement stake, hanging gallows, or related scaffold), but gibbeting refers to the use of a gallows-type structure from which the dead or dying bodies of criminals were hanged on public display to deter other existing or potential criminals.
- Grave robbery is the act of uncovering a grave, tomb or crypt to steal commodities.
- Headhunting is the practice of hunting a human and collecting the severed head after killing the victim, although sometimes more portable body parts (such as ear, nose or scalp) are taken instead as trophies.
- Human trophy collecting involves the acquisition of human body parts as trophy, usually as a war trophy, or as a status symbol of superior masculinity. Psychopathic serial murderers' collection of their victims' body parts have also been described as a form of trophy-taking; the FBI draws a distinction between souvenirs and trophies in this regard.
- Maschalismos is the practice of physically rendering the dead incapable of rising or haunting the living in undead form.
- Necrophilia is sexual attraction towards or a sexual act involving corpses.
- Posthumous execution is the ritual or ceremonial mutilation of an already dead body as a punishment.

== See also ==
- List of ways people honor the dead
- Death and culture
- Taboo
