= Grave goods =

Items buried along with the body

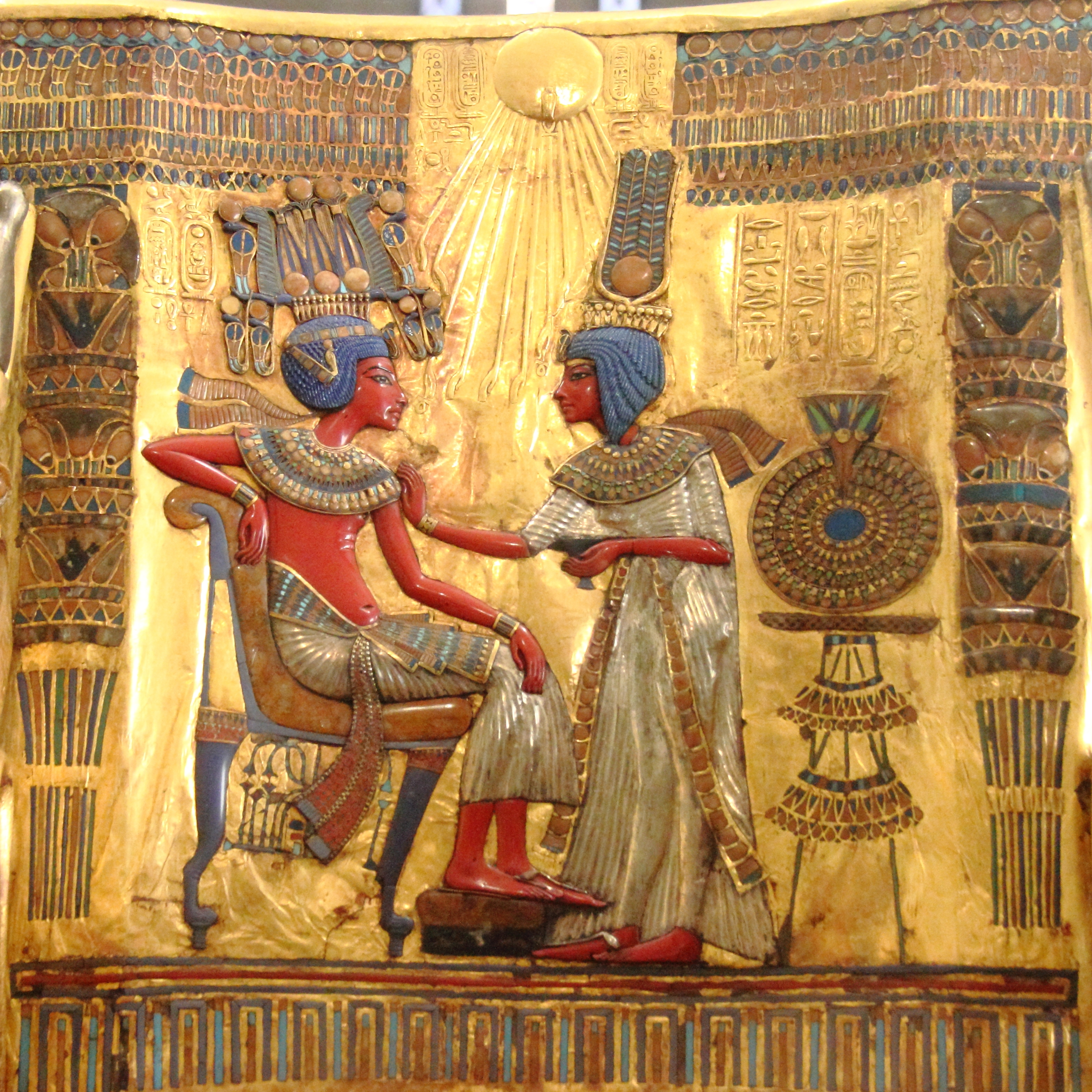
The gilded throne of Pharaoh Tutankhamun is but one of the treasures found within his tomb.

Grave goods, in archaeology and anthropology, are items buried along with a body.

They are usually personal possessions, supplies to smooth the deceased's journey into an afterlife, or offerings to gods. Grave goods may be classed by researchers as a type of votive deposit. Most grave goods recovered by archaeologists consist of inorganic objects such as pottery and stone and metal tools, but organic objects that have since decayed were also placed in ancient tombs. If grave goods were to be useful to the deceased in the afterlife, then favorite foods or everyday objects were supplied. Oftentimes, social status played a role in what was left and how often it was left. Funerary art is a broad term but generally means artworks made specifically to decorate a burial place, such as miniature models of possessions - including slaves or servants - for "use" in an afterlife. (Ancient Egypt sometimes saw the burial of real servants with the deceased. Similar cases of human sacrifice of slaves, retainers and wives feature in graves in (for example) the Americas, ancient Germania, and ancient Mesopotamia. Compare suttee.)

Where grave goods appear, grave robbery is a potential problem. Etruscans would scratch the word śuθina, Etruscan for "from a tomb", on grave goods buried with the dead to discourage their reuse by the living. The tomb of pharaoh Tutankhamun is famous because it was one of the few Egyptian tombs that was not thoroughly looted in ancient times.

Grave goods can be regarded as a sacrifice intended for the benefit of the deceased in the afterlife. Closely related are customs of ancestor worship and offerings to the dead, in modern western culture related to All Souls' Day (Day of the Dead), in East Asia the "hell bank note" and related customs. Also closely related is the custom of retainer sacrifice, where servants or wives of a deceased chieftain are interred with the body. As the inclusion of expensive grave goods and of slaves or retainers became a sign of high status in the Bronze Age, the prohibitive cost led to the development of "fake" grave goods, where artwork meant to depict grave goods or retainers is produced for the burial and deposited in the grave in place of the actual sacrifice.

== History ==
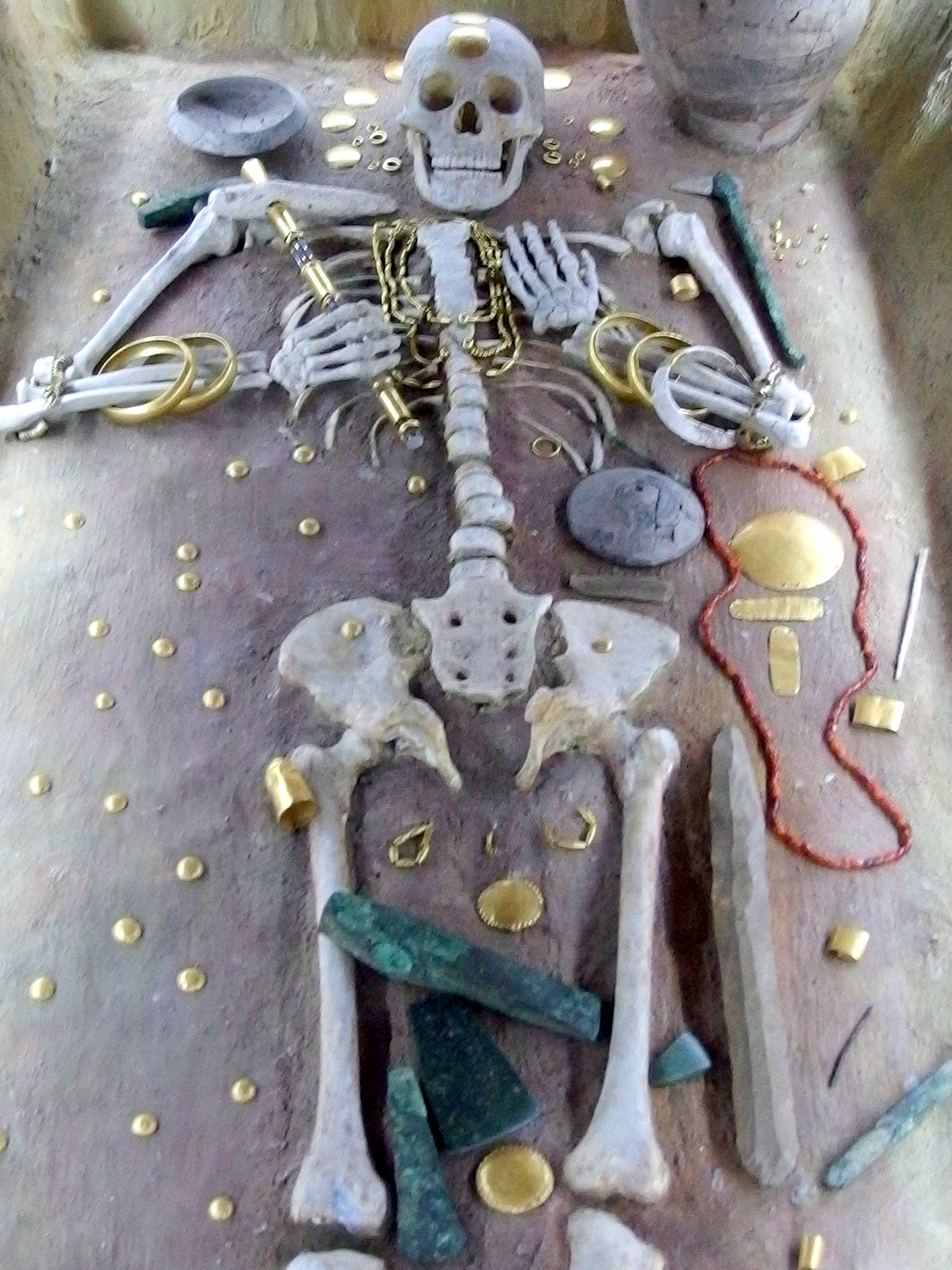
Reconstruction of an elite burial of the Varna culture, Bulgaria, c. 4500 BC

The 430,000-year-old Sima de los Huesos hominins are believed to have been intentionally buried, although some scholars reject this hypothesis. They were found with a single, large Acheulean handaxe, which has been suggested to have been a grave good.

There are disputed claims of intentional burial of Neanderthals as old as 130,000 years. Similar claims have been made for early anatomically modern humans as old as 100,000 years. The earliest undisputed cases of homo sapiens burials are found in Upper Palaeolithic sites.

Burials that include intentional artifacts come much later. There is evidence of Egyptians (of the Badarian culture) being buried with grave goods very early in their prehistory. Examples of these items include pots, shells, combs, stone vessels, animal figurines, and slate palettes.

Beads made of basalt deposited in graves in the Fertile Crescent date to the end of the Upper Paleolithic, beginning in about the 12th to 11th millennium BC.

The distribution of grave goods are a potential indicator of the social stratification of a society. Thus, early Neolithic graves tend to show equal distribution of goods, suggesting a more or less classless society, while in Chalcolithic and Bronze Age burials, rich grave goods are concentrated in "chieftain" graves (barrows), indicating social stratification. It is also possible that burial goods indicate a level of concern and consciousness in regard to an afterlife and related sense of spirituality. For example, when they buried pharaohs in ancient Egypt, they buried common house hold items, food, vehicles, etc. so they could have a comfortable afterlife.

== Famous grave sites ==
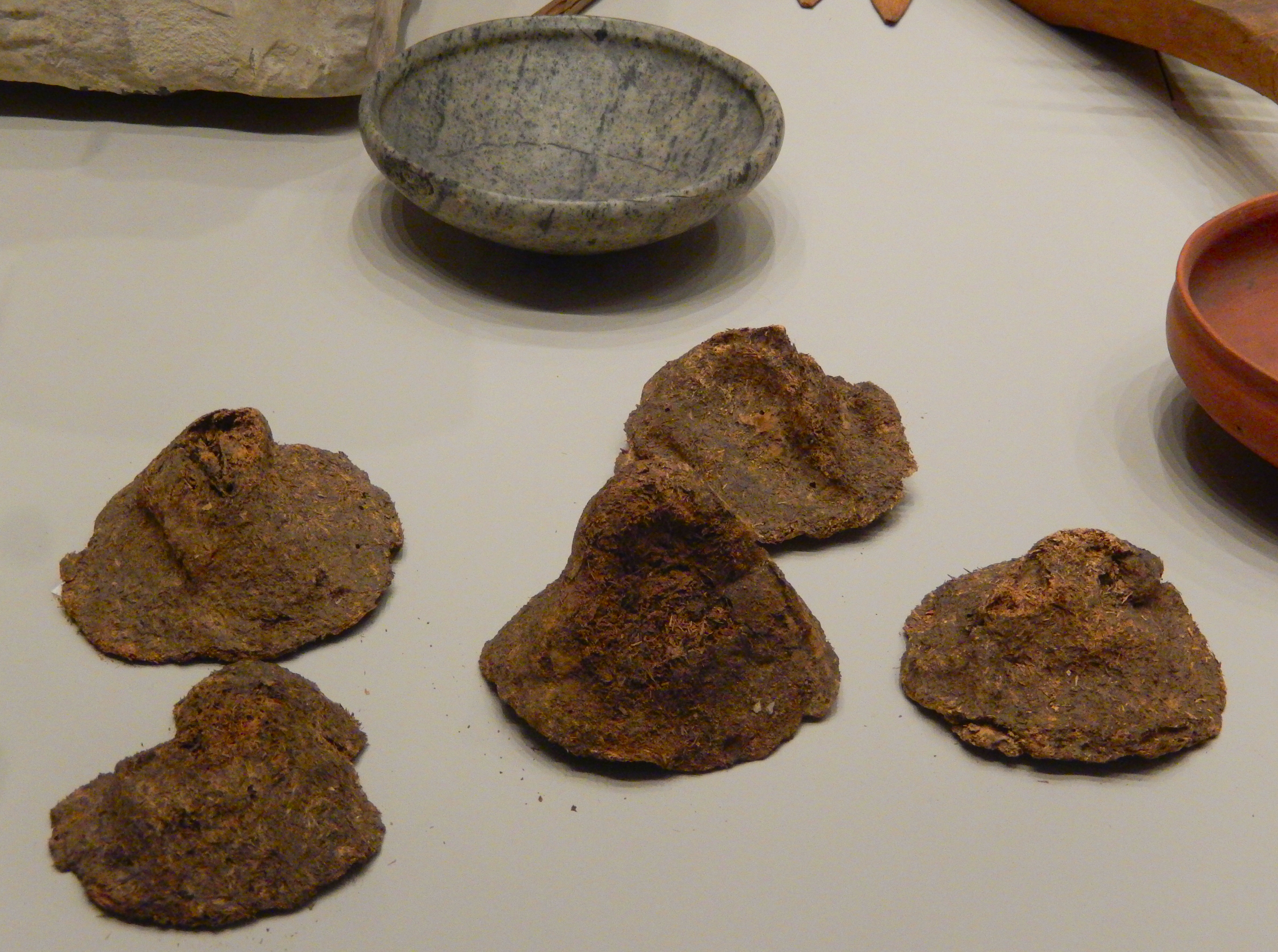
Conical loaves of bread as grave goods exactly as laid out in the Great Tomb, North Necropolis, Gebelein, 5th Dynasty (Old Kingdom), 2435–2305 BC. Excavations by Ernesto Schiaparelli, 1911. Egyptian Museum, Turin, S. 14051–14055

The expression of social status in rich graves is taken to extremes in the royal graves of the Bronze Age. In the Theban Necropolis in Ancient Egypt, the pyramids and the royal graves in the Valley of the Kings are among the most elaborate burials in human history. This trend is continued into the Iron Age. An example of an extremely rich royal grave of the Iron Age is the Terracotta Army of Qin Shi Huang.

In the sphere of the Roman Empire, early Christian graves lack grave goods, and grave goods tend to disappear with the decline of Greco-Roman polytheism in the 5th and 6th centuries. Similarly, the presence of grave goods in the Early Middle Ages in Europe has often been taken as evidence of paganism, although during the period of conversion in Anglo-Saxon England and the Frankish Empire (7th century), the situation may be more complicated. In the Christian Middle Ages, high-status graves are marked on the exterior, with tomb effigies or expensive tomb stones and still had certain grave goods such as accessories and textiles.

The practice of placing grave goods with the dead body has thus an uninterrupted history beginning in the Upper Paleolithic, if not the Middle Paleolithic. Many people would assume that the introduction of Christianity led to the absence of grave goods, however, there were many different Christian tombs that were shown to still have grave goods such as jewelry.

== Role in archaeology ==
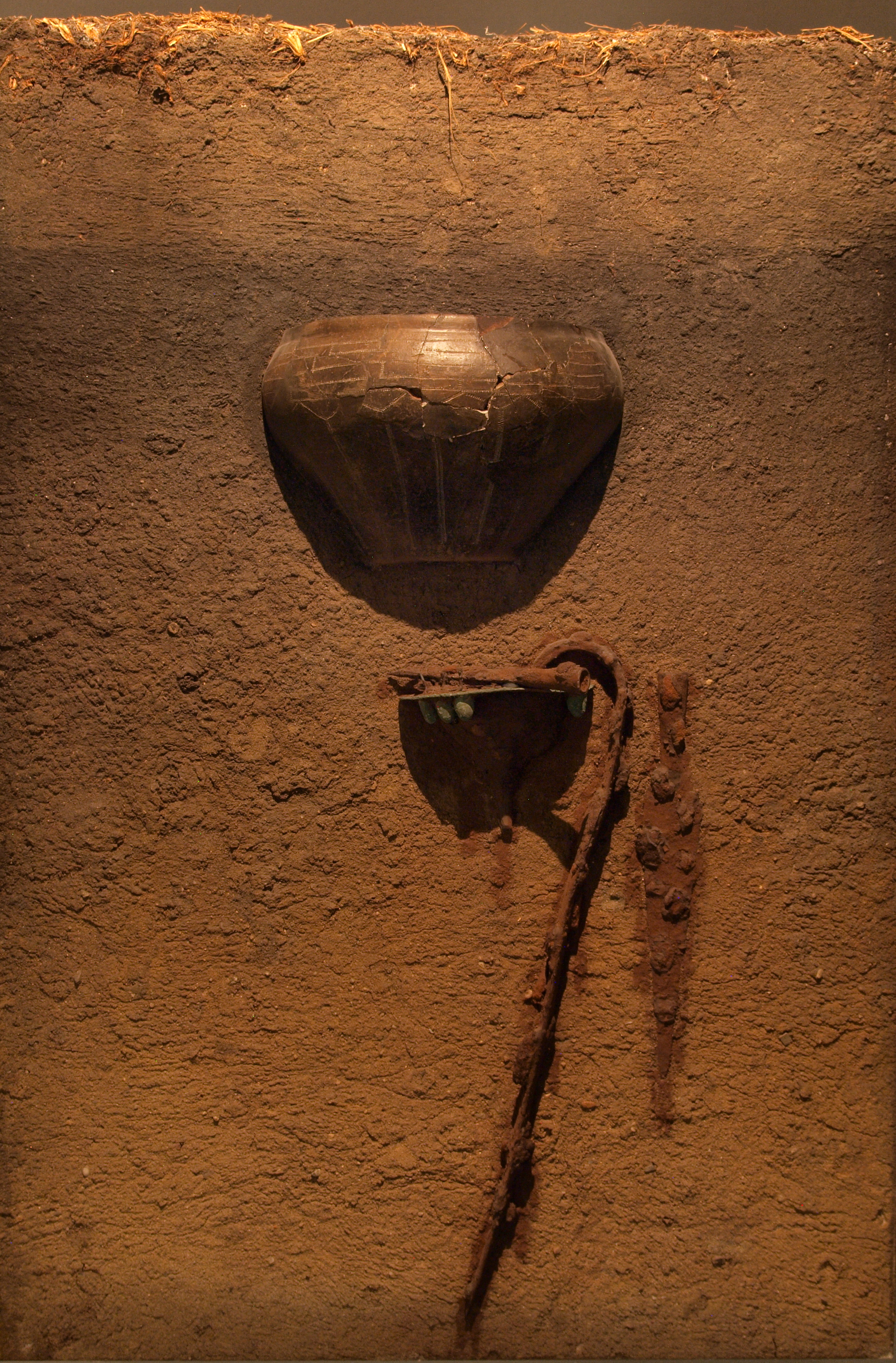
Model of the warrior's burial 'Hamburg-Marmstorf Grave No. 216', dating to circa 50 A.D., Hamburg-Marmstorf, Hamburg, Germany. At the upper edge are turf and the plough horizon. Below are the burial in a ceramic urn and beneath that the grave goods.

The importance of grave goods, from the simple behavioral and technical to the metaphysical, in archaeology cannot be overestimated. Because of their almost ubiquitous presence throughout the world and throughout prehistory, in many cases the excavation of every-day items placed in burials is the main source of such artifacts in a given prehistoric culture. However, care must be taken to avoid naïve interpretation of grave goods as an objective sample of artifacts in use in a culture. Because of their ritual context, grave goods may represent a special class of artifacts, in some instances produced especially for burial. Artwork produced for the burial itself is known as funerary art, while grave goods in the narrow sense are items produced for actual use that are placed in the grave, but in practice the two categories overlap.

Grave goods in Bronze Age and Iron Age cemeteries are a good indicator of relative social status; these wealthier graves may have included earrings, necklaces, and exotic foreign materials such as amber. Some even had the spectacular sighting of gold as their grave goods which contrasted from the less wealthy graves which were more deficient. Also, in a 2001 study on an Iron Age cemetery in Pontecagnano Faiano, Italy, a correlation was found between the quality of grave goods and Forensic indicators on the skeletons, showing that skeletons in wealthy tombs tended to show substantially less evidence of biological stress during adulthood, with fewer broken bones or signs of hard labor.

Along with social status, grave goods also shed light on the societal norms with regards to sex. Common binary societies had women perform duties such as mothering, processing activities, cooking, etc. and men perform duties such as hunting and fighting. These societies would bury their women with jewelry and their men with axes. The Durankulak cemetery on the Bulgarian Black Sea Coast had findings to match this society structure. There are societies where the roles are switched. The Sauromatian society's women were highly respected warriors. Their graves were full of weapons and horse trappings. When it was difficult to determine sex of the individual due to bone decay, the grave goods became the determining factor.

== In modern times ==
Grave goods continue to be important in modern funerary rituals. In contemporary English and American culture, bodies may be buried with goods such as eyewear, jewelry, photographs, and letters. In addition, objects are sometimes left above ground near or on top of gravestones. Flowers are common, although visitation stones are preferred in Jewish culture. In addition, coins for the dead (including challenge coins) are sometimes left on American military graves by comrades of the deceased.

== See also ==
- Burial
- Grave field
- Necropolis
- Mingqi, the traditional Chinese burial goods
- Permanent jewellery
