= Grave desecration =

Act of vandalism to dishonour the dead

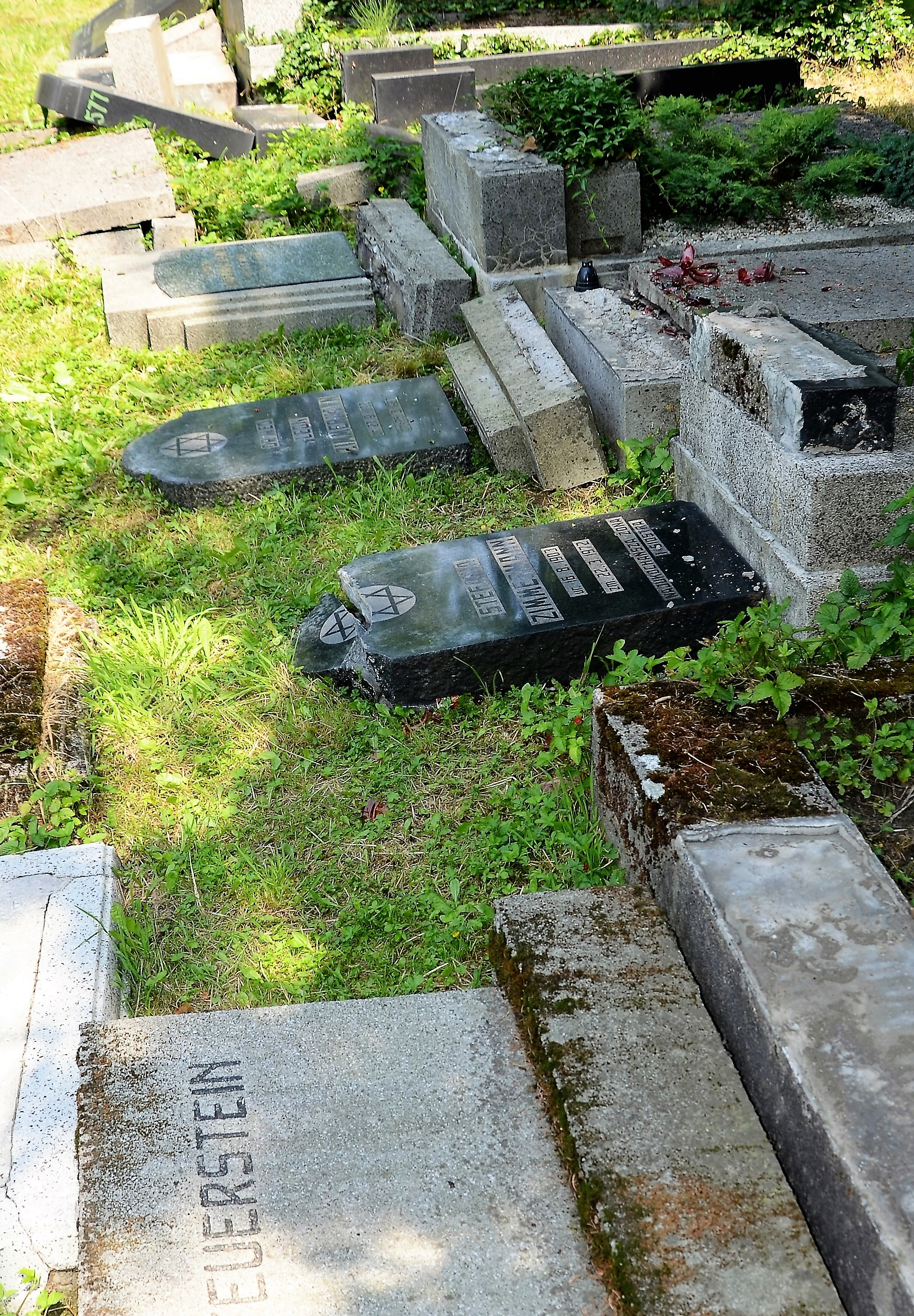
Desecration of a Jewish cemetery in Bielsko-Biała, Poland in June 2021, an example of antisemitism

The desecration of graves involves intentional acts of vandalism, theft, or destruction in places where humans are interred, such as body snatching or grave robbing. It has long been considered taboo to desecrate or otherwise violate graves or grave markers of the deceased, and in modern times it has been prohibited by law. Desecration is defined as violating something that is sacred.

== History ==
=== Theft ===
One form of grave desecration is grave robbery. In Egypt many of the tombs in the Valley of the Kings were robbed and looted of valuables. Papyrus scrolls from 2000 BC detail accounts of looting. The accounts also spell out the punishment that thieves received. The sentence varied from the removal of the thief's ears or nose. One punishment was execution.

The 3rd century Chinese text Lüshi Chunqiu advised mourners to plan simple burials to discourage looting. Many Chinese were buried with valuables, including jade burial suits. In modern China, grave robbing continues.

=== Body snatching ===
Illegal body snatching from graves provided cadavers for sale to medical schools for dissection during anatomy demonstrations. Because of the taboo and theft of corpses the dissection of corpses was often carried out in secret. Body snatching was practiced by resurrectionists in the United Kingdom until the Anatomy Act 1832. In the United States the practice fed into the myth of Night Doctors. Many cemeteries installed gates and fences.

=== Vandalism ===
Graves have historically been the target for vandalism desecration. In the mid-1850s, the villagers of Silwan were paid £100 annually by the Jews in an effort to prevent the desecration of graves on the Mount of Olives.

In modern times people continue desecrating grave sites. Occasionally the vandalism-desecration is religiously motivated. Jewish cemeteries are occasionally targets for vandalism.

In some cases the desecration is racially motivated, like in the 2004 case of two white teens who desecrated the grave of James Byrd Jr. (a black man who was dragged to death) in Jasper, Texas. The teens were charged with criminal mischief after scrawling profanities on a steel plate and knocking over his grave marker.

=== Grave reuse ===
The United Kingdom Parliament passed the Burial Act 1857. Concerns arose that due to rapidly expanding cities because of the industrial revolution, burial graves were reused too quickly. The offense of disturbing a burial included in the Burial Act 1857 was based on the belief that a grave was to be undisturbed for eternity. Section 25 of the Burial Act 1857 made it unlawful in England and Wales to disturb human burials without a license or on ground consecrated by the rites of the Church of England, without the permission of the church.

=== Cemetery relocation ===
Cemeteries may also be moved so that the land can be reused for transportation structures. In some countries it is forbidden to move a cemetery. In Alberta, Canada, for instance, the Cemetery Act expressly forbids the relocation of cemeteries or the mass exhumation of marked graves for any reason whatsoever.

=== Urinating on someone's grave ===
As a form of great disrespect to the dead, a person urinates on the decedent's grave. In 17th century Churchyard-Väki tradition, one was expected to proceed with quiet reverence in a cemetery. According to Väki folklore, people could be punished by "angered beings" or "fall sick" for simply urinating in a graveyard.

=== Razing of cemeteries ===
==== Mount of Olives in Jerusalem ====
By the end of 1949, and throughout the Jordanian rule, some Arab residents uprooted tombstones and plowed the land in the cemeteries at the Mount of Olives, and an estimated 38,000 tombstones were damaged in total. During this period, a road was paved through the cemetery, in the process destroying graves including those of famous persons. In 1964, the Intercontinental Hotel was built at the summit of the mount. Graves were also demolished for parking lots and a filling station and were used in latrines at a Jordanian Army barracks.

==== Razing of Uyghur cemeteries by Chinese officials ====
In January 2020, CNN reported that China appears to have been demolishing Uyghur cemeteries as part of a control campaign against Muslim minorities and Islamic beliefs within China. CNN reported that over 100 traditional Uyghur cemeteries have been destroyed. Most of these were destroyed within the last two years. In October 2020, AFP and satellite imagery analysts Earthrise Alliance first reported the razing of Uyghur cemeteries. At least 45 of these cemeteries had been razed since 2014.

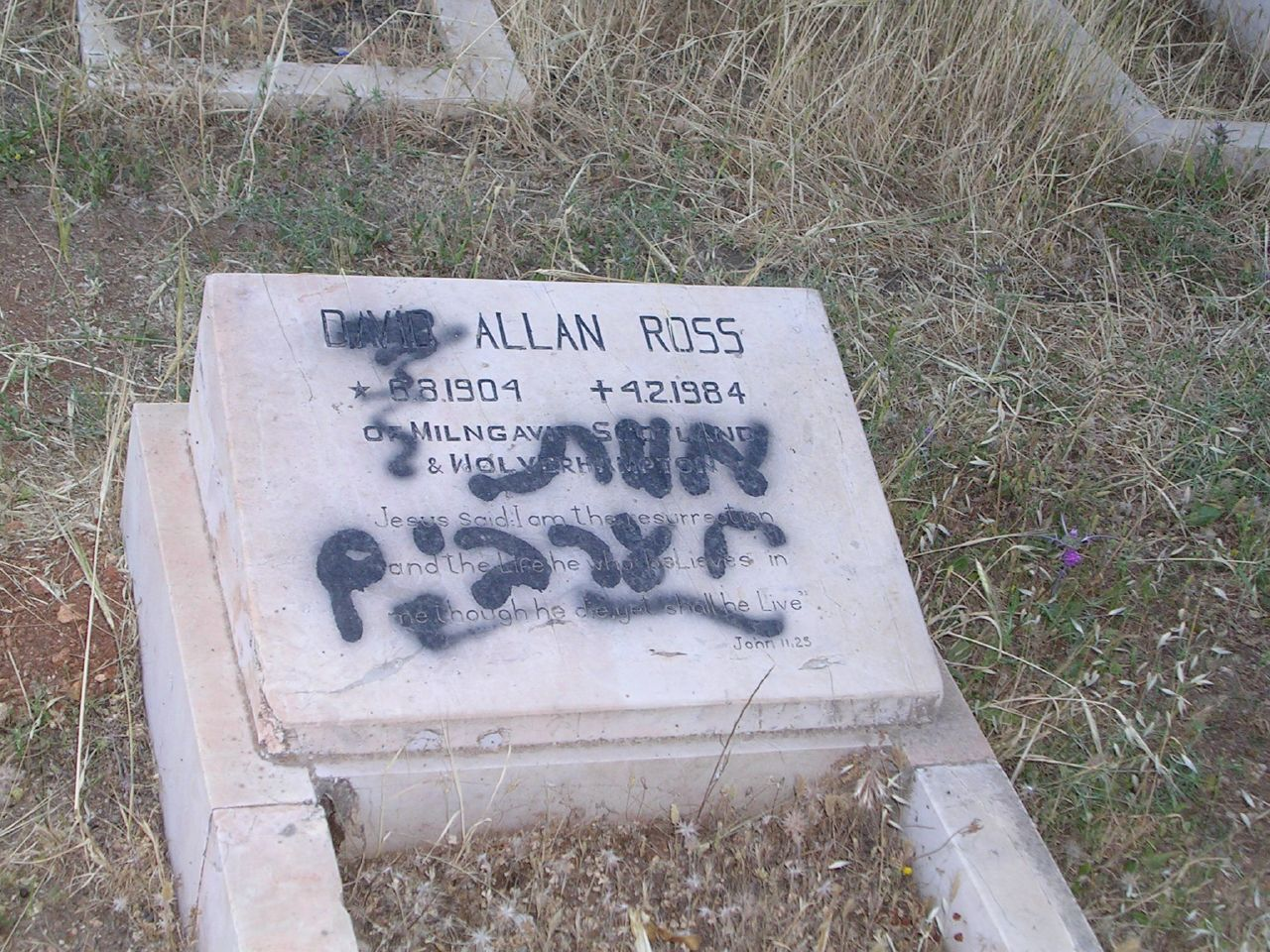
A grave in Bethlehem with the Anti-Arab slogan "Death to Arabs" spray-painted on it in Hebrew.

==== Israeli razing of cemeteries in the Gaza Strip ====
In December 2023 The New York Times reported that Israeli forces razed six cemeteries in the Gaza Strip including in Shajaiye, Sheikh Ijlin, and Beit Lahia. Euro-Med Human Rights Monitor reported bulldozing and desecration of more Gaza cemeteries than the Times did. It also reported large holes have been created in cemeteries as a result of frequent Israeli attacks, engulfing dozens of graves, and the remains of some dead bodies have been scattered or have disappeared. The cemeteries included Sheikh Shaaban Cemetery in Palestine Square, Gaza City (17-20 December, which included trampling of corpses), a cemetery ca. 1.7 km east of central Khan Yunis, and St. Porphyrius Church Cemetery in Gaza City. Intentional destruction of religious sites without military necessity is a possible war crime. The IDF has claimed that it has dug up graves to search for the bodies of hostages, but none were found.

==== Razing of cemeteries of the members of Assad family ====
On 11 December 2024, Syrian rebel fighters destroyed the tomb of late president Hafez al-Assad, father of the ousted president of Syria, Bashar al-Assad, in the family's hometown in Qardaha, Latakia Governorate, Syria. Viral videos verified by the BBC showed armed men chanting as they walked around the burning mausoleum and desecrated the graves of Hafez and his eldest son, Bassel al-Assad. Videos of armed men burning Assad's grave and urinating on it were published online. On 28 April 2025, videos and photos on social media showed his grave being exhumed by unidentified individuals. His remains were reportedly transferred to an unknown location.

== Law ==
In many cases it is against the law to deface or desecrate grave sites or human remains. These include removing gravestones, leaving trash, disturbing, or tampering with a gravesite. People are also not allowed to open any repository of human remains or cover over or destroy. In many cases these are felonies. For instance NY Penal Law § 145.23: Cemetery desecration involves attempts to: vandalize, spray paint, or steal from places that are used for human interment.

According to United States legal case Dangerfield v. Williams, 26 App. D.C. 508 (D.C. Cir. 1906) as long as people recognize that an area serves as a graveyard it remains a sacred place, even if there are no new burials and the graves are neglected.

== See also ==
- List of ways people dishonor the dead
