= Coins for the dead =

Historical bereavement practice

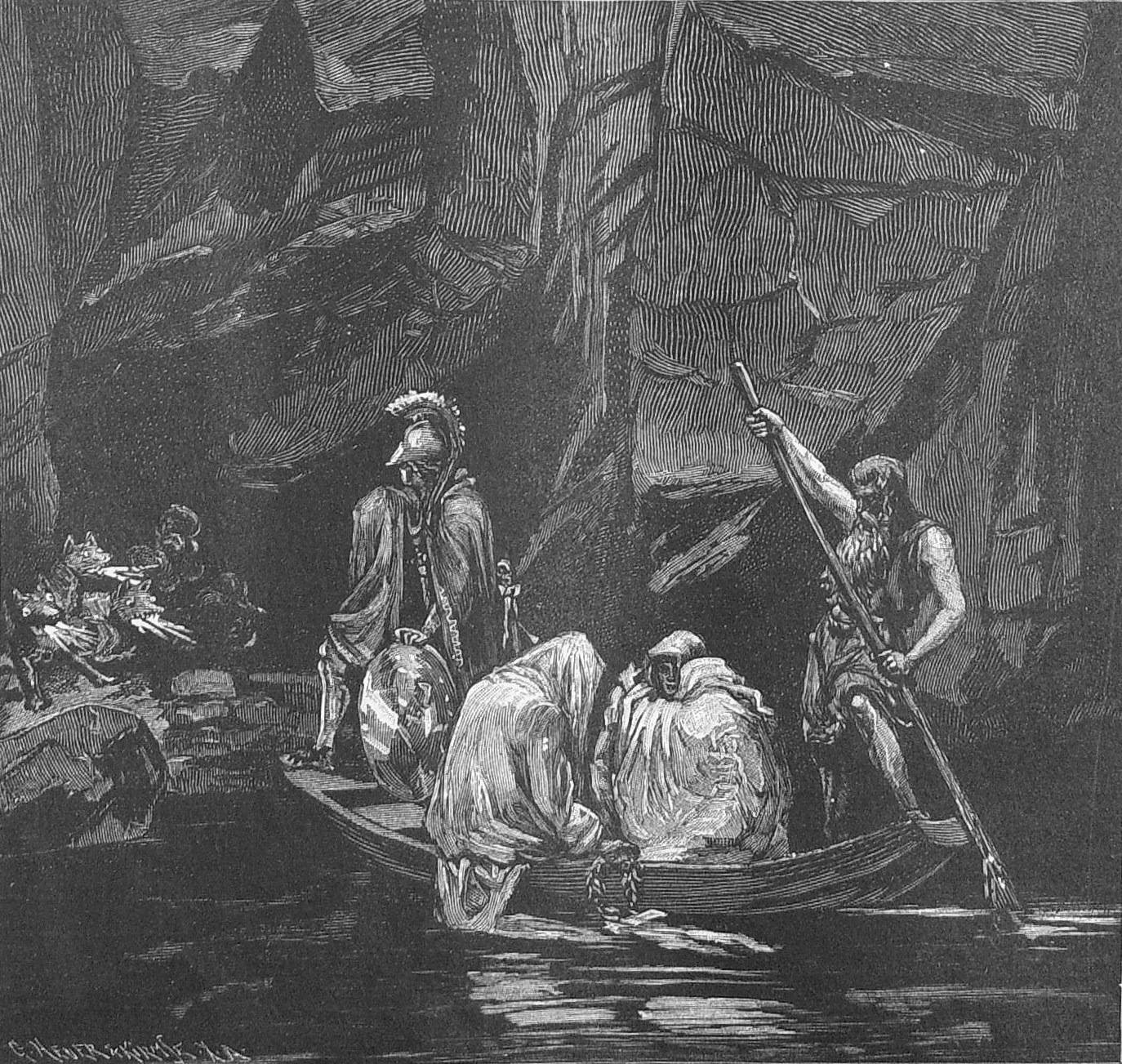
Depiction of Charon crossing the river Styx with the dead after they paid the cost of the crossing. Die Gartenlaube (1886)

Coins for the dead is a form of respect for the dead or bereavement. The practice began in classical antiquity when people believed the dead needed coins to pay a ferryman to cross the River Styx. In modern times the practice has been observed in the United States and Canada: visitors leave coins on the gravestones of former military personnel.

== History ==
=== Ancient practice ===
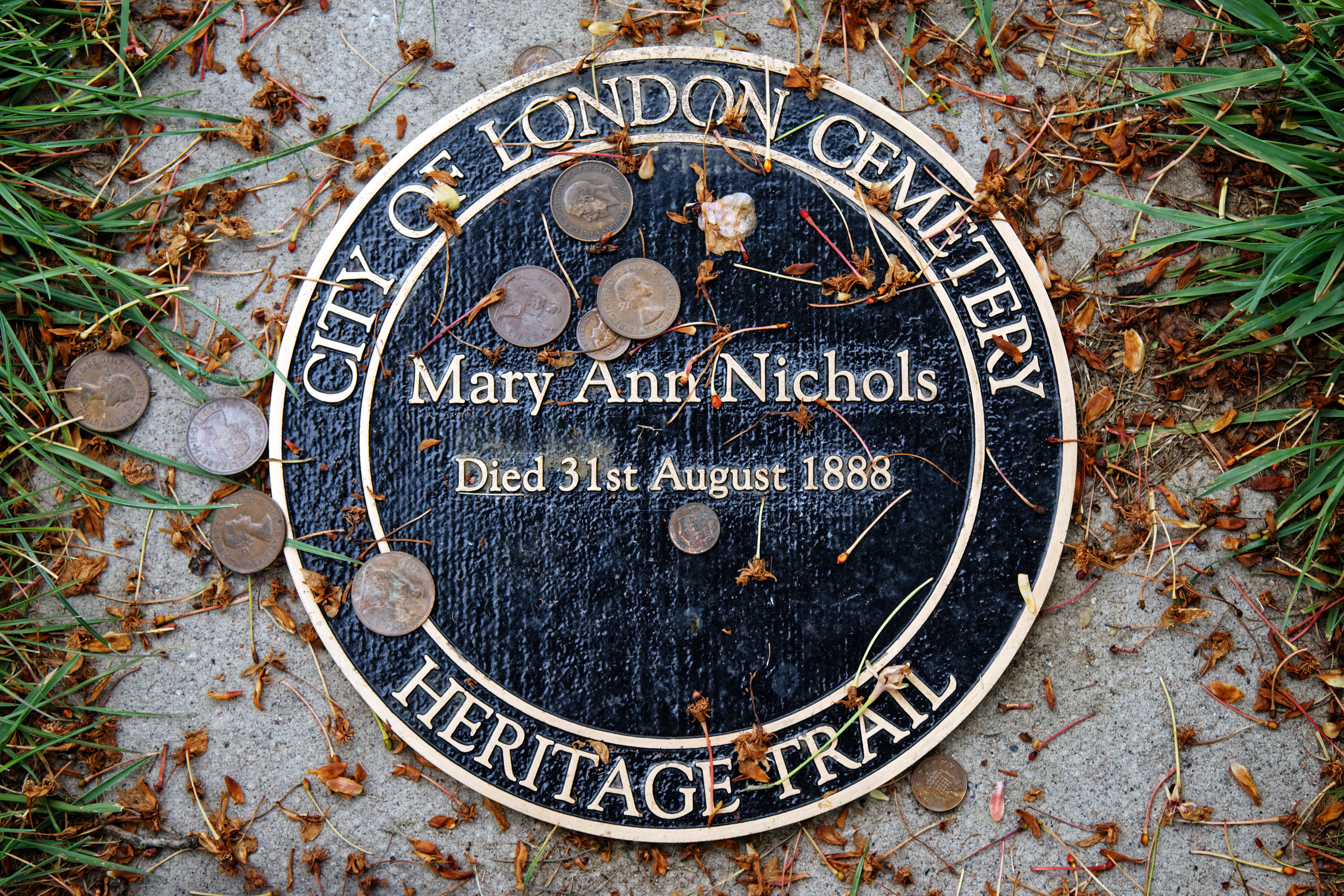
Mary Ann Nichols grave marker at City of London Cemetery and Crematorium, with a number of British pre-decimal and decimal pennies and an American one cent coin left by visitors

Cemetery visitors began the practice of leaving coins for the dead in ancient Greece and ancient Rome. It was believed that when people died, they needed coins to pay Charon to cross the river Styx. It was believed that without coins, the dead would not be able to cross, and they would therefore live on the banks of the Styx river for 100 years. Greeks were also known to put a coin known as Charon's obol in the mouths of dead people.

Ancient Egyptians followed the practice of burying people with riches that they might need in the next life.

=== Modern practice ===
In modern times the practice of leaving coins for the dead has been primarily for the military graves. The practice of leaving coins at military personnel grave markers is both American and Canadian tradition. It is seen as a way to show respect for the person's sacrifice. Each denomination signifies the level of relationship the visitor had with the dead.

- Penny means a person visited.
- Nickel means the visitor went to bootcamp with the decedent.
- Dime means the visitor served with the deceased.
- Quarter means the visitor was present when the decedent was killed.

Some large cemeteries discourage the practice of leaving coins: Barbara Lewandowski, a spokesperson for Arlington National Cemetery, has asked visitors not to leave coins, because they cause injuries during grass cutting. She said leaving coins at the military cemetery was very common.

== See also ==
- Chinese burial money, Joss paper
- Death and culture
- List of ways people honor the dead
- Visitation stones
