= Mortuary enclosure =

Burial structure

A mortuary enclosure is a term given in archaeology and anthropology to an area, surrounded by a wood, stone or earthwork barrier, in which dead bodies are placed for excarnation and to await secondary and/or collective burial. There are some parallels with mortuary houses although the two are the products of different cultural practices and traditions regarding the treatment of the dead.

The mortuary enclosures of the British Neolithic were sub-rectangular banks with external ditches and raised platforms of stone or wood within them, thought to be used for the exposure of corpses prior to burial elsewhere. Remains of mortuary enclosures of this period are often found under long barrows. Evidence from mortuary sites in Britain suggests that in the Neolithic era bodies were often defleshed and disarticulated with specific bones such as skulls or thigh bones separated and relocated apart from the body. There is considerable academic debate on the reason for these practices.
