= Ying Yuan =

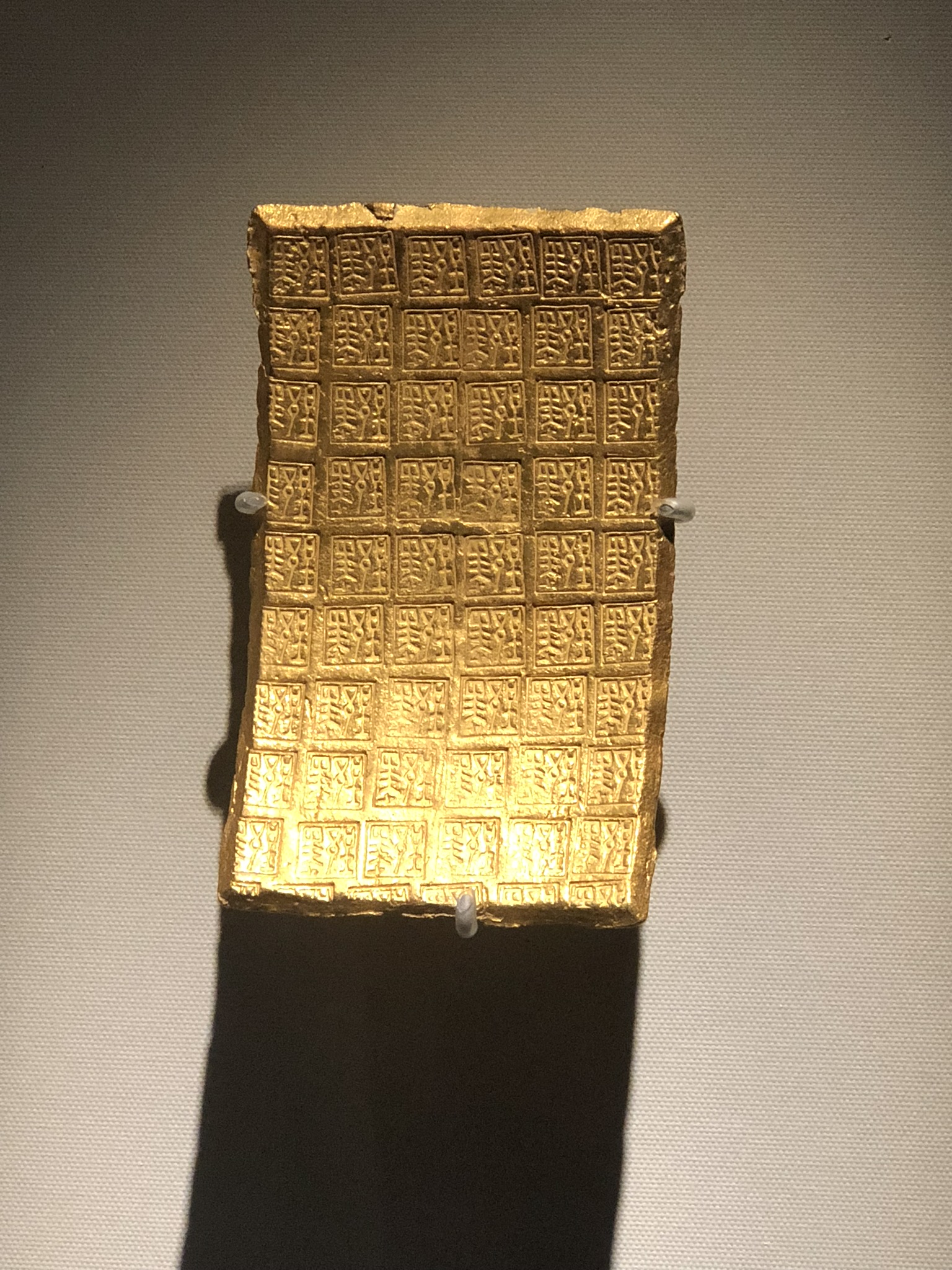
Intact ying yuan ingot, with repeating stamps. Nanjing Museum.

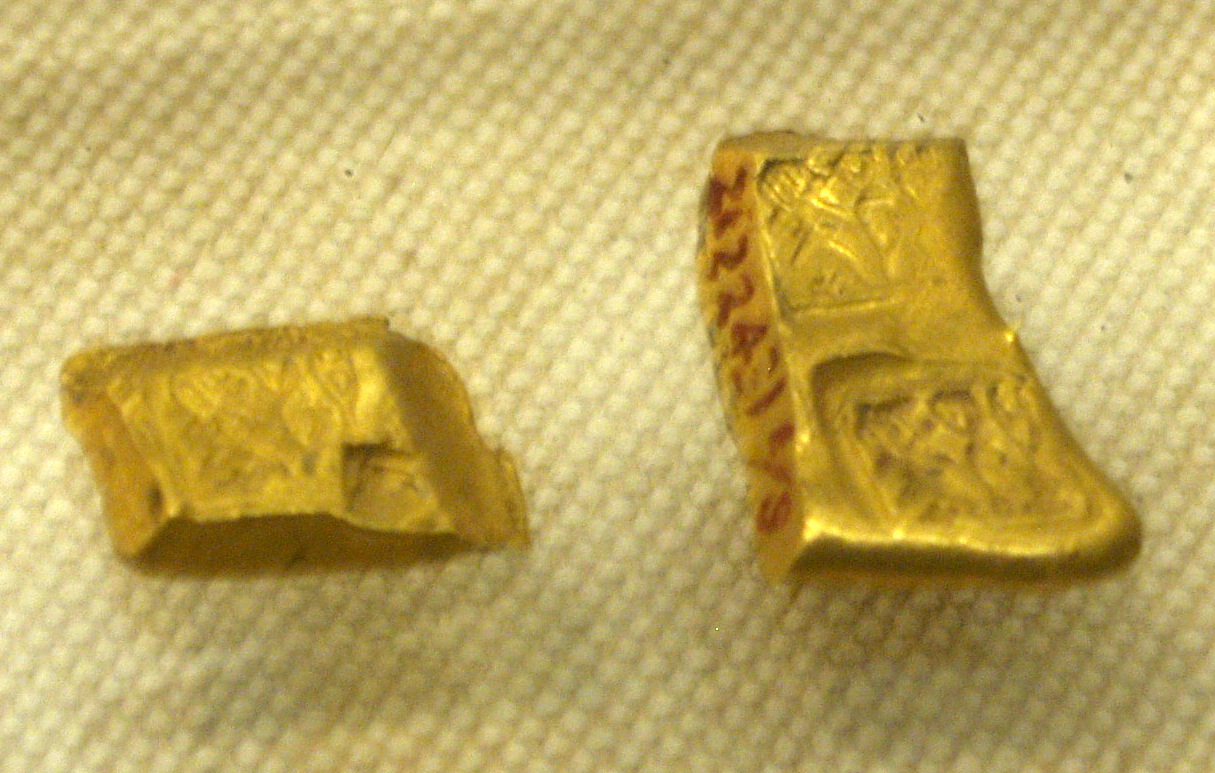
Broken ying yuan pieces

Ying Yuan (Chinese: 郢爰; pinyin: yǐng yuán) were stamped blocks of gold bullion. This was an early form of currency that could be considered a precursor to gold coins. They were issued by the ancient Chinese state of Chu during the Warring States period between the 400s and late 200s BCE.

== Names ==
Because these gold blocks are inscribed with Chinese characters they are variously known as yin zi jin (Chinese: 印子金; pinyin: yìn zǐ jīn), jin ban (Chinese: 金版; pinyin: jīn bǎn), or gui bi (traditional Chinese: 龜幣; simplified Chinese: 龟币; pinyin: guī bì).

== History and overview ==
The oldest ones known are from about the 5th or 6th century BCE. They consist of sheets of gold 3-5mm thick, of various sizes, with inscriptions consisting of square or round stamps in which there are one or two characters. They have been unearthed in various locations south of the Yellow River indicating that they were products of the State of Chu. One of the characters in their inscription is often a monetary unit or weight which is normally read as yuan (Chinese: 爰; pinyin: yuán). Pieces are of a very variable size and thickness, and the stamps appear to be a device to validate the whole block, rather than a guide to enable it to be broken up into unit pieces.

Some ying yuan contain the Chinese characters ying yuan (郢爰).

Another inscription that is sometimes found on these ancient gold blocks is chen yuan (陳爰).

Some specimens have been reported in copper, lead, or clay. It is probable that these were funeral money, not circulating currency, as they are found in tombs, but the gold ones are not.

== See also ==
- Economic history of China
- Ancient Chinese coinage
