= Visitation stones =

Jewish bereavement practice

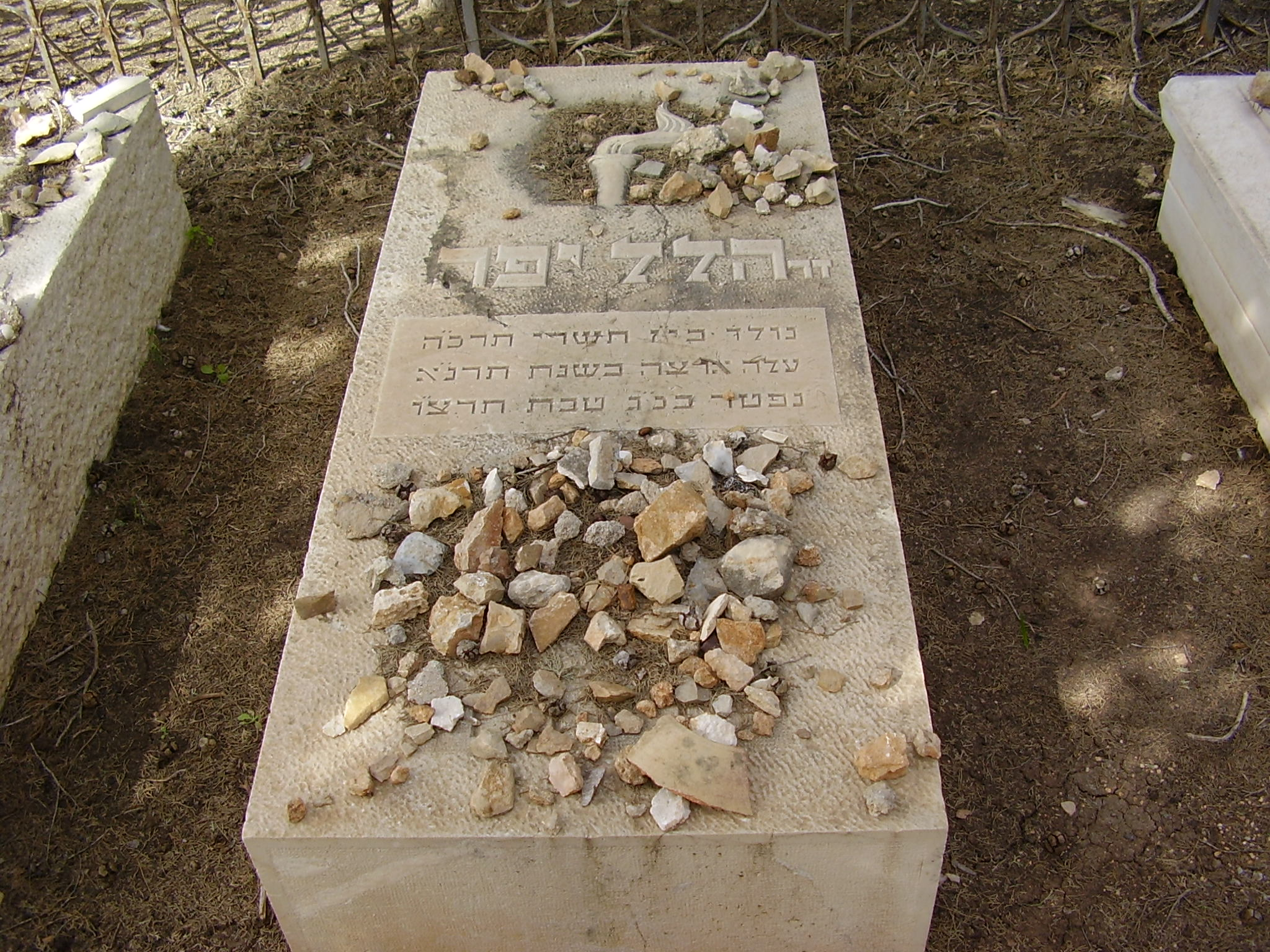
Stones on the grave of the physician and Zionist Hillel Yaffe

The act of placing visitation stones is significant in Jewish bereavement practices. Small stones are placed by people who visit Jewish graves in an act of remembrance or respect for the deceased. The practice is a way of participating in the mitzvah (commandment) of burial. It is customary to place the stone with the left hand.

== History ==
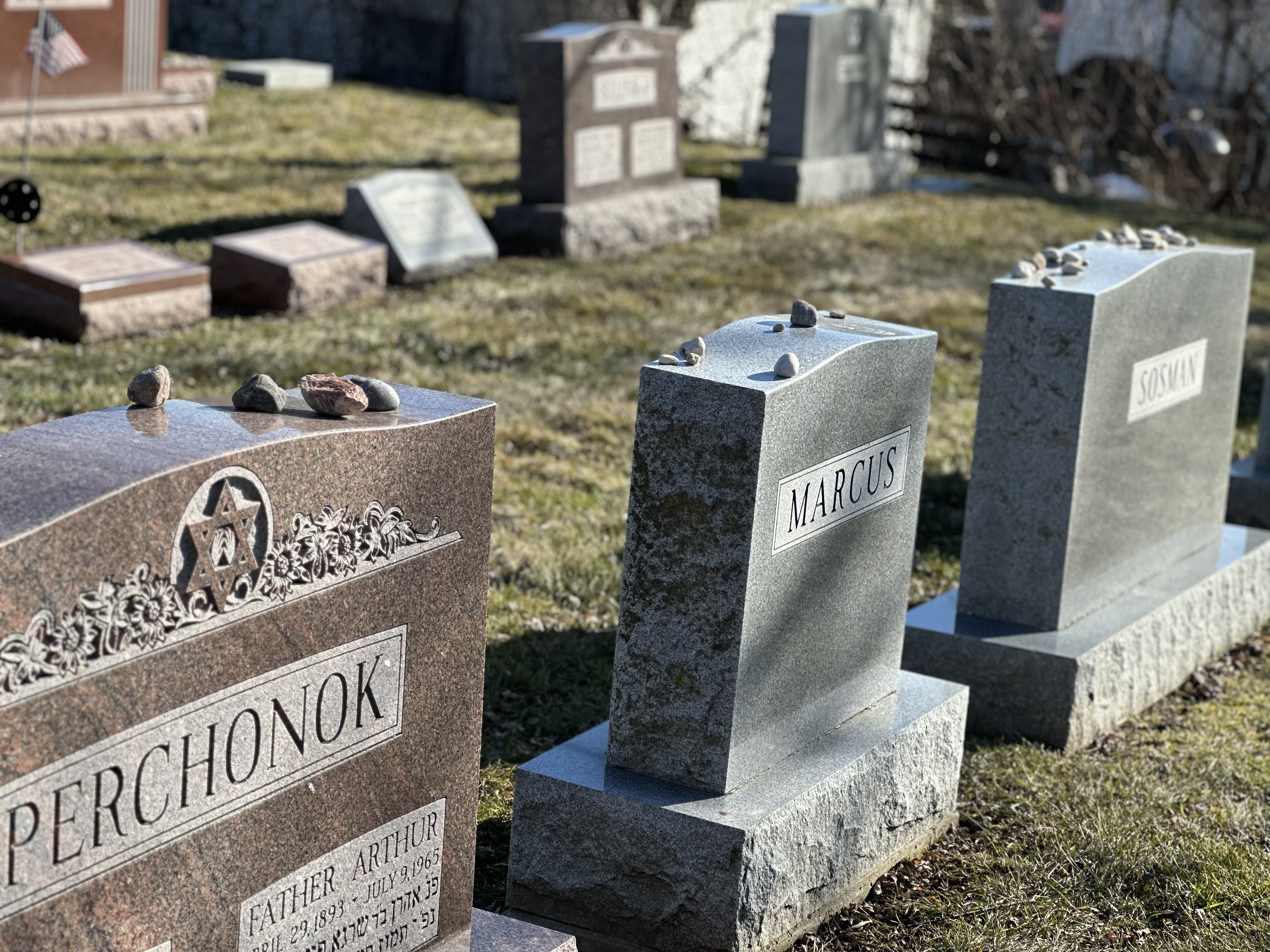
Visitation stones on Jewish headstones

Marking a grave with stones was customary in Biblical times before the adoption of gravestones. The oldest graves in the Old Cemetery in Safed are piles of rocks with a more prominent rock bearing an inscription.

It is not customary in Judaism to leave flowers at a grave after visiting. It is believed to be more appropriate to give money to charity that could otherwise be spent on flowers. In addition, cut flowers eventually die, but stones are enduring and do not die.

Formerly the tradition might have been to insert notes into crevices in the grave marker. This tradition may be related to the practice of placing notes in the Western Wall in Jerusalem. Letters may have been formerly written to the deceased and held down by a stone; the stone would have been left after the paper blew away.

The tradition has also been noted outside of Jewish mourning practices; Robert MacFarlane notes the presence of stones placed by mourners in the alcoves of the recesses of resting stones in ancient Ireland.

== Interpretation ==
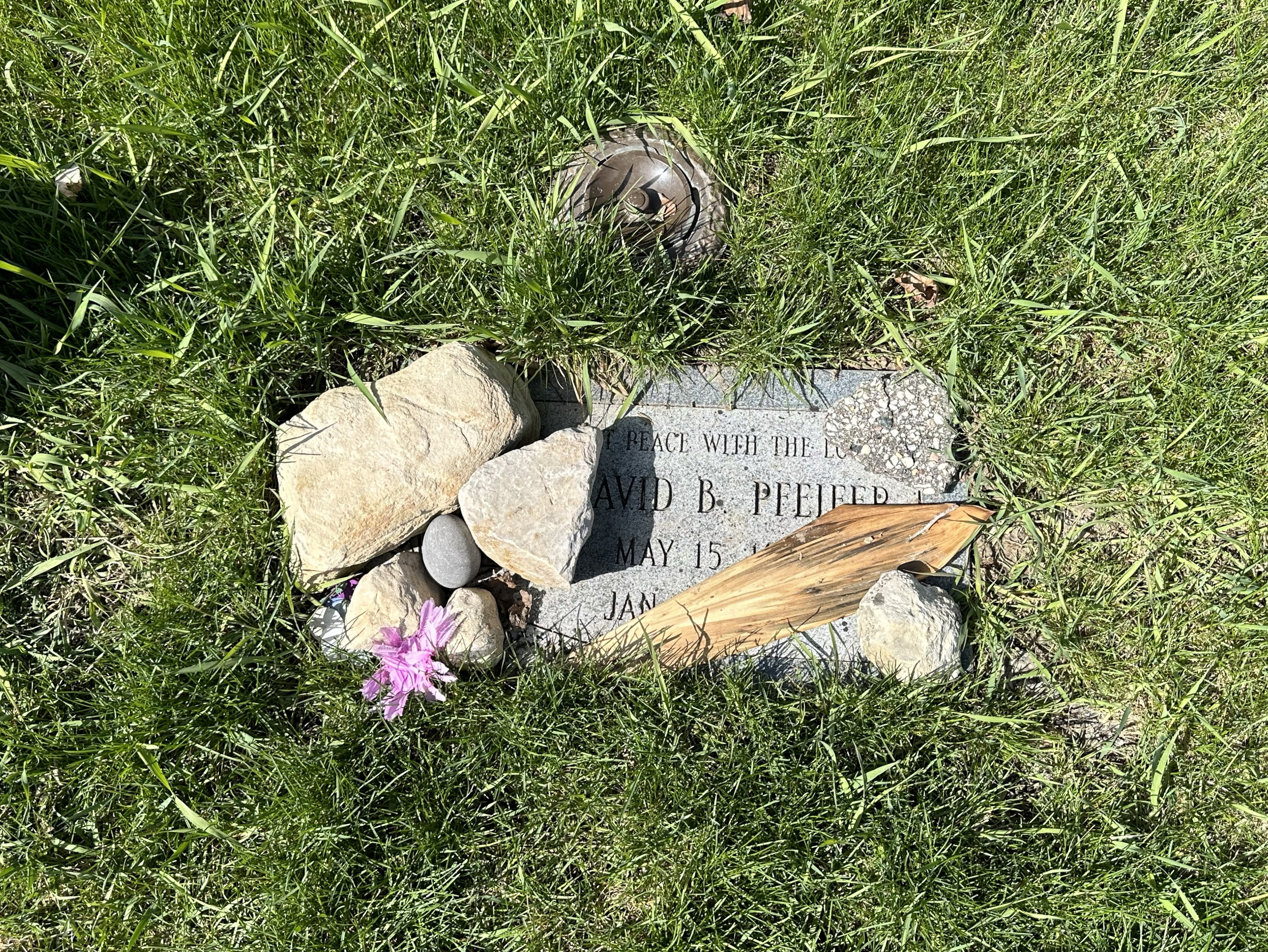
Christian grave with visitation stones

Various explanations have been given for the origin of the practice:

- Stone is frequently used in the torah as a metaphor for God in Judaism
- To ensure that kohanim should not be affected by corpse impurity by inadvertently coming into close proximity with a grave
- To ensure that the mitzvah is maintained by marking the grave with rocks
- To show respect and let others know that the grave has been recently visited.
- It happens that the Hebrew word for pebble is "tz'ror" but the word also means "bond" in Hebrew.

== See also ==
- Chinese burial money – Historic Chinese funerary ritual
- Coins for the dead – Historical bereavement practice
- List of mortuary customs
