= Putridarium =

Temporary grave

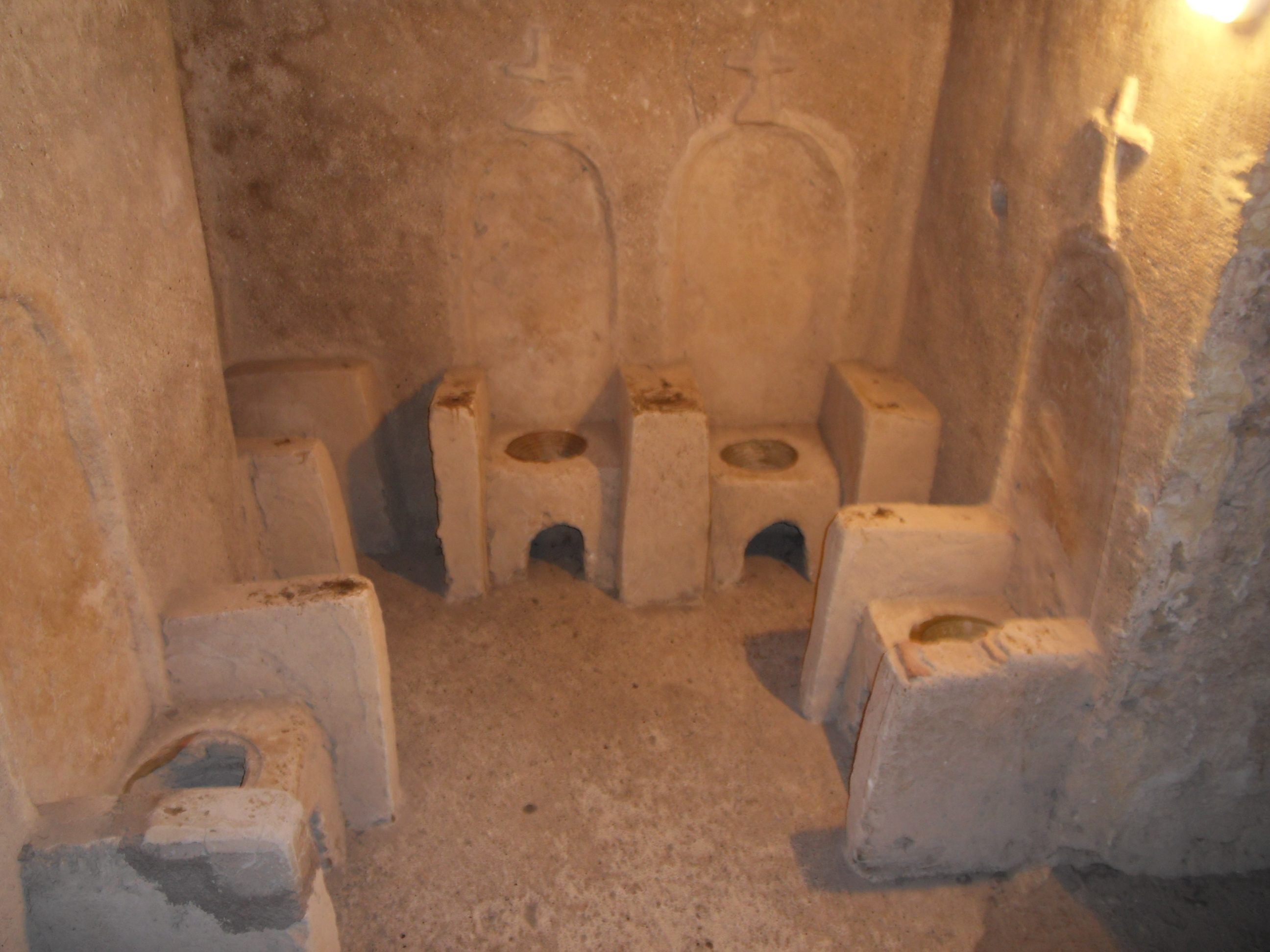
Stone seats in the putridarium in a Poor Clares convent cemetery, Castello Aragonese, Ischia

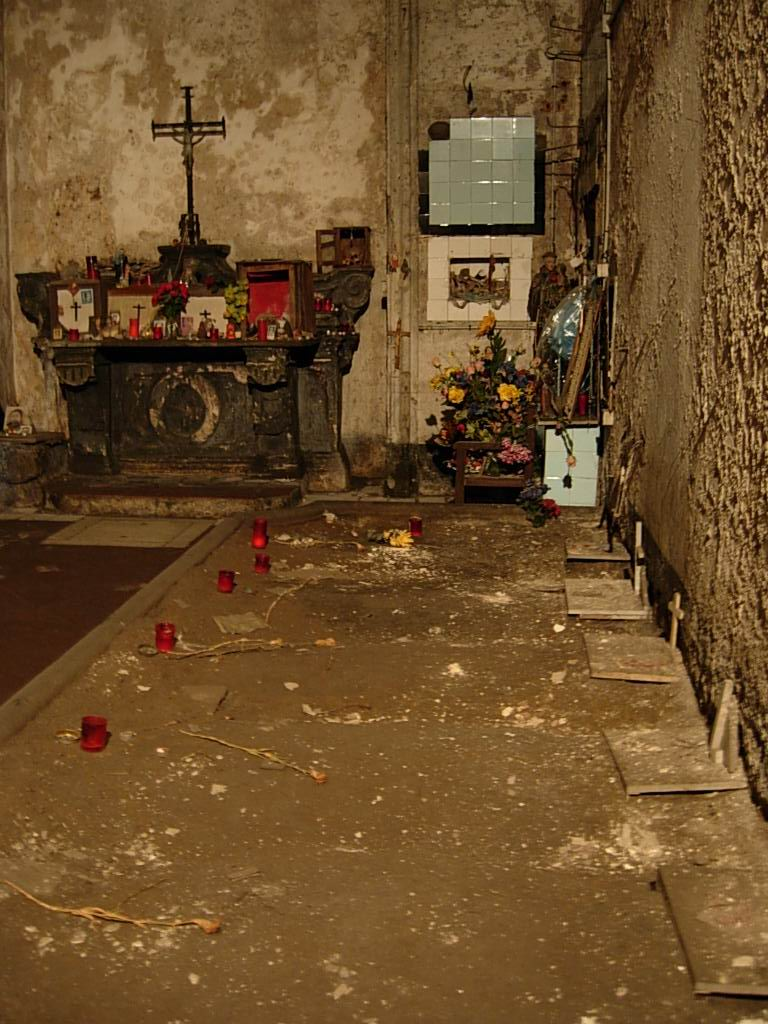
Purgatorio ad Arco, Naples

The putridarium is a temporary burial place, generally in an underground crypt, in which bodies, commonly of monks or nuns, can be stored in wall niches, often seated on masonry chairs with a central hole and vessel to collect the liquids of decomposition. Once the bodies have reached a proper stage of decomposition, the bones are collected, cleaned, and stored in an ossuary.

== Bibliography ==
- Antonio Fornaciari, Valentina Giuffra e Francesco Pezzini, Processi di tanatometamorfosi: pratiche di scolatura dei corpi e mummificazione nel Regno delle Due Sicilie, Borgo San Lorenzo, All'insegna del giglio, 2008 (consultabile anche sul sito Paleopatologia).
