= Funeral coin =

Coins issued on the occasion of the death of a prominent person

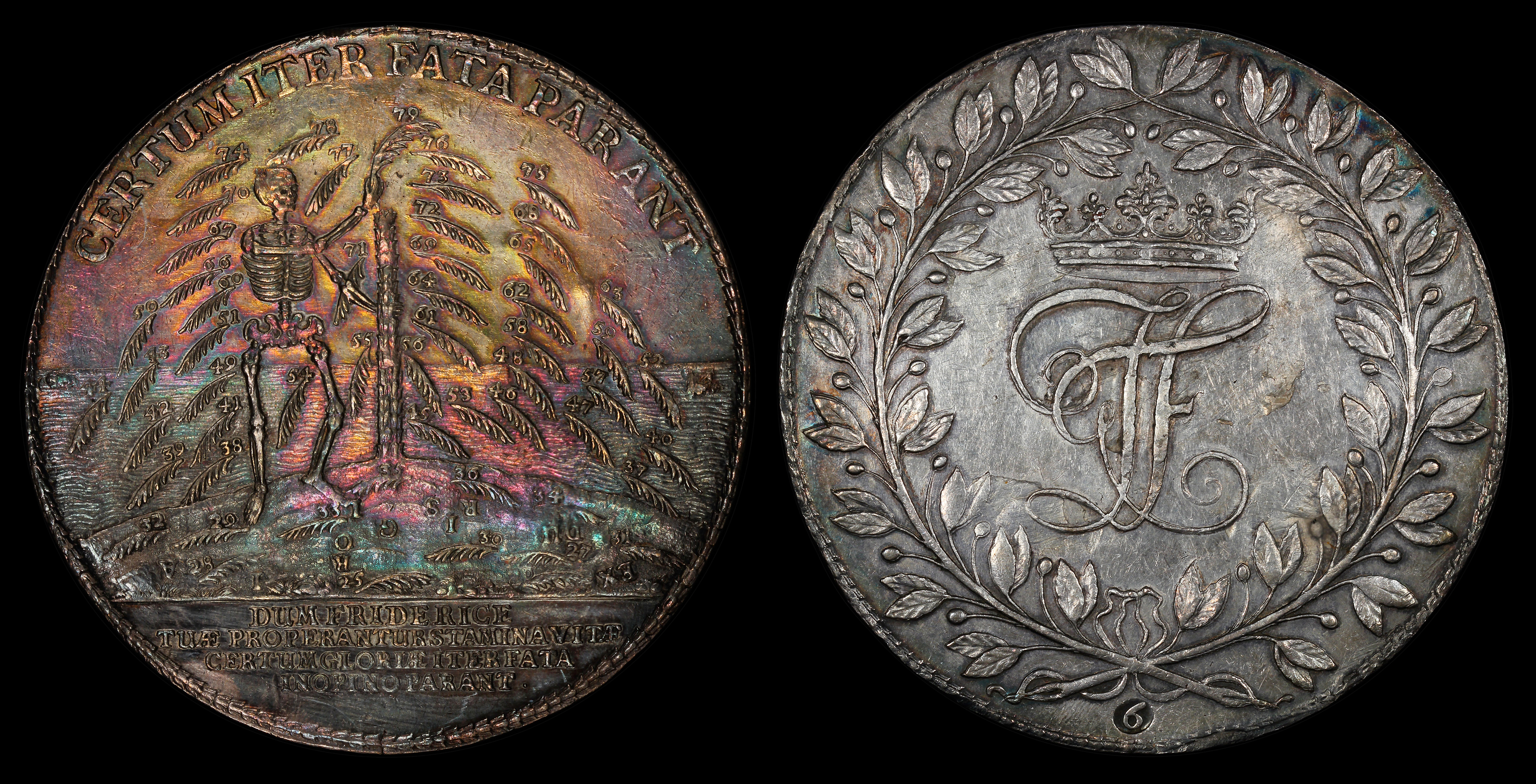
6 Sterbethaler John Frederick, Duke of Brunswick-Lüneburg († 1679); obv.: monogram JF in laurel wreath, rev.: Death as a skeleton, breaking the fronds off a palm tree (We. 1692)

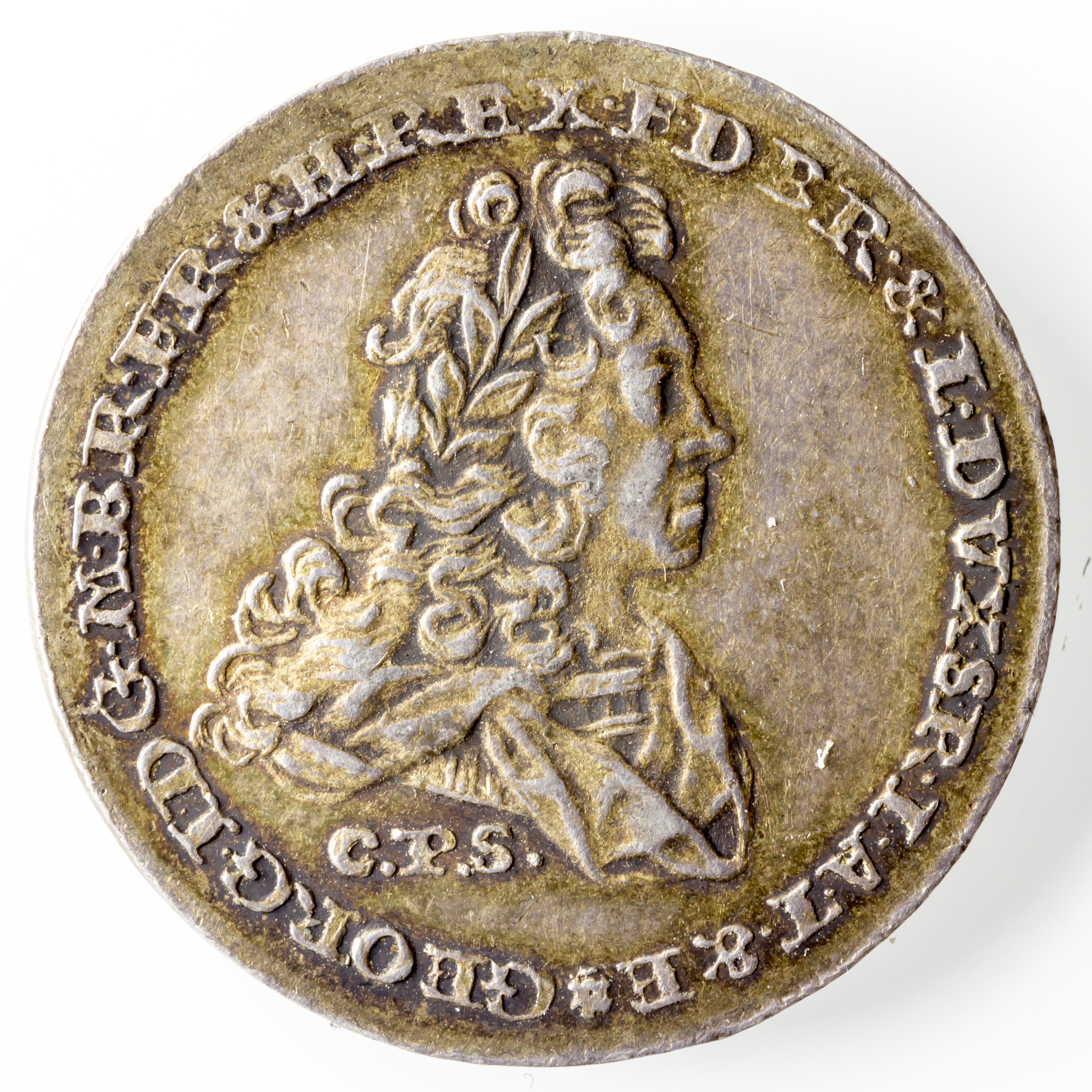
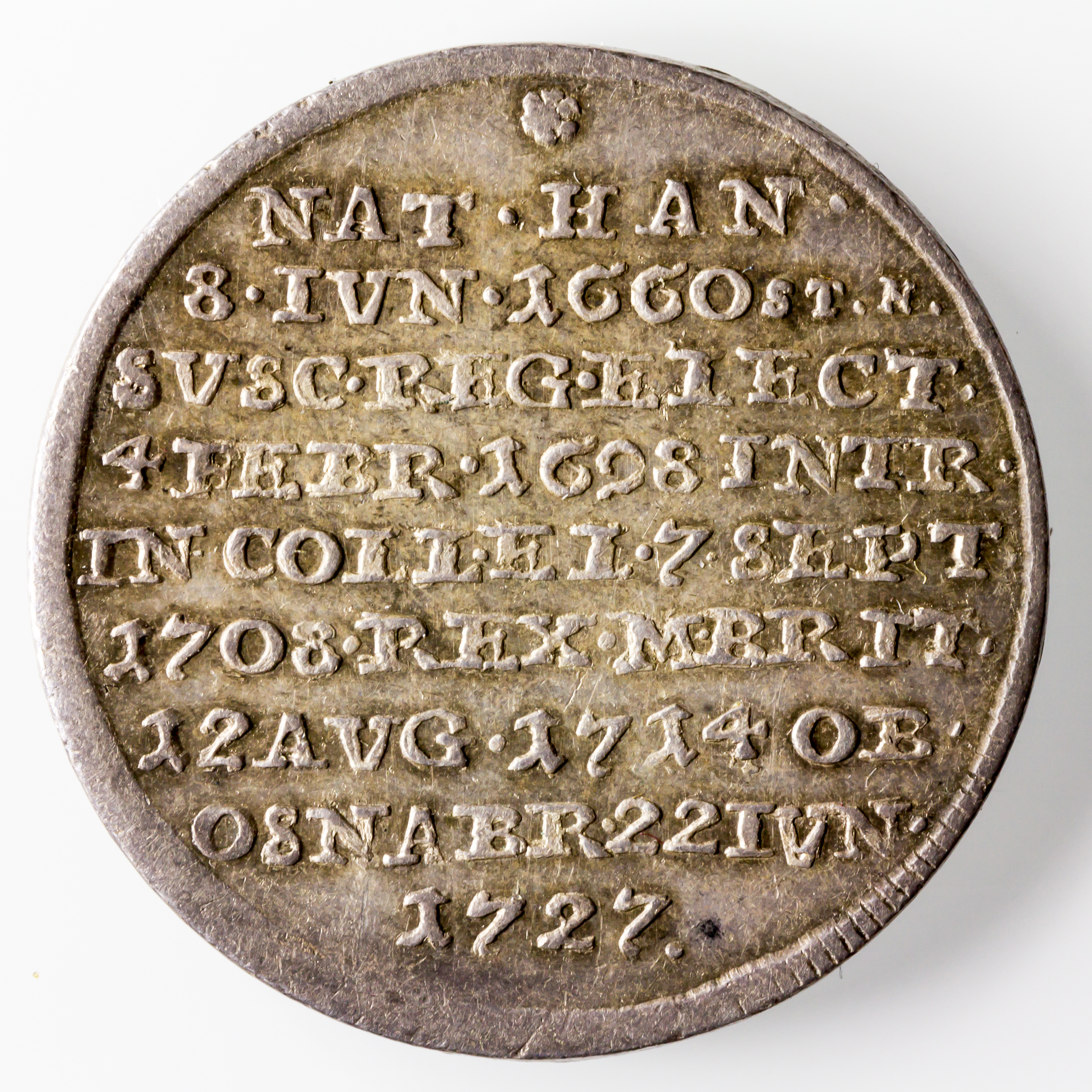
1/4 Sterbethaler George I of Great Britain as prince-elector of the Electorate of Brunswick-Lüneburg († 1727); obv.: portrait from the right, rev.: biography in Latin (We. 2254)

The term funeral coin is used for coins issued on the occasion of the death of a prominent person, mostly a ruling prince or a coin-lord. The obverse of such a coin usually depicts the portrait of the deceased; the reverse may show the coat of arms and important biographic data.

The first issues regarded as funeral coins were struck in Germany in the late 12th century upon the death of Albert the Bear († 1170) and Archbishop Wichmann († 1192) of Magdeburg. Around the middle of the 16th century, funeral coins were issued in some states of the Holy Roman Empire. Their minting was frequent until the end of the eighteenth century, especially in the Electorate of Saxony and the Electorate of Brunswick-Lüneburg; in Prussia, on the other hand, there were only a few funeral coins, so in 1713 on the occasion of the death of King Frederick I and 1786 after the death of Frederick the Great.

Usually, funeral coins are commemorative coins of precious metals with high nominal values, but there are also funeral coins as currency money. Frequently the coins are designated according to their type with (German) terms like Sterbet(h)aler, Sterbegulden, Sterbedukaten or Sterbegroschen.
