= List of coin hoards in China =

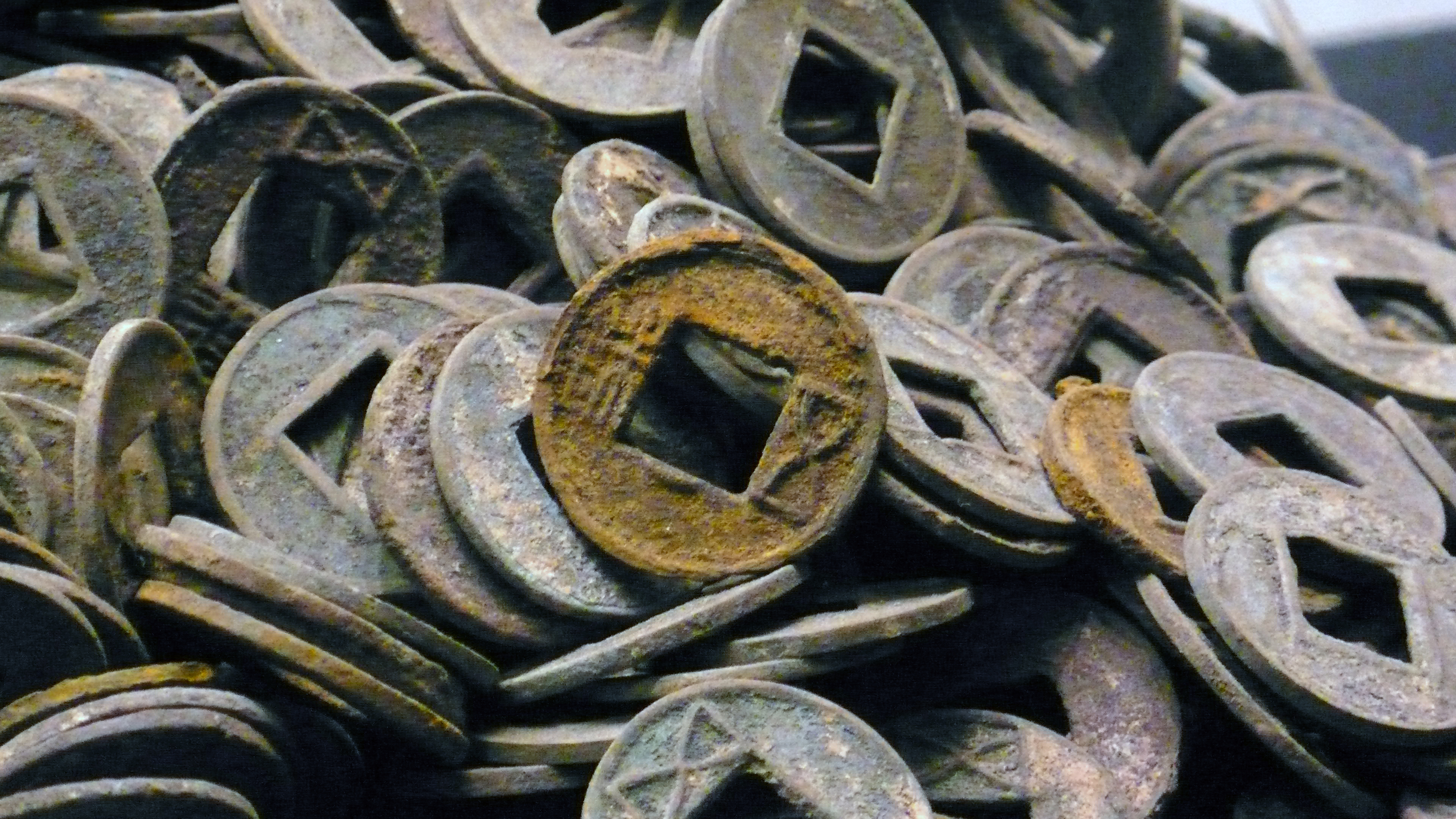
A large number of Wu Zhu (五銖) cash coins on display at the "Dazzling Life: Archaeological Finds of the Marquis of Haihun State in Han Dynasty. March 2, 2016 to June 2, 2016." (五色炫耀——南昌汉代海昏侯国考古成果展。2016年3月2日至6月2日，首都博物馆。) exhibition at the Capital Museum, Beijing.

The list of coin hoards in China (traditional Chinese: 中國錢幣窖藏清單; simplified Chinese: 中国钱币窖藏列表; pinyin: zhōng guó qián bì jiào cáng liè biǎo) lists significant archaeological hoards of coins, other types of coinages (e.g. sycees) or objects related to coins discovered in China (the People's Republic of China in Mainland China, Hong Kong, Macau, and the Free area of the Republic of China, e.g. Taiwan). The history of Chinese currency dates back as early as the Spring and Autumn period (770–476 BCE), and the earliest coinages took the form of imitations of the cowrie shells that were used in ceremonial exchanges. During the Warring States period new forms of currency such as the spade money, knife money, and round copper-alloy coins were introduced (further reading: Zhou dynasty coinage and Ancient Chinese coinage). After unification of China under the Qin dynasty in 221 BC the Ban Liang (半兩) cash coin became the standard coinage, under the Han dynasty the Wu Zhu (五銖) cash coins became the main currency of China until they were replaced with the Kaiyuan Tongbao (開元通寳) during the Tang dynasty, after which a large number of inscriptions were used on Chinese coinages. During the late nineteenth century China started producing its own machine-struck coinages.

In Chinese culture coins are often used as burial objects and it's not uncommon for coins to be discovered in tombs and graves.

Occasionally foreign coins are also found in China, which were brought there through international trade routes such as the Silk Road, overseas trade with foreign countries, and colonialism. Similarly, large quantities of Chinese coins have been found in neighbouring countries like Japan, Korea, and Vietnam, as well as far away places like Elcho Island, Kenya, and Yukon.

In 2021 a paper was published about an old mint that was discovered at an archeological site in Henan Province, through radiocarbon-dating the spade money found there was attributed to have been created between 640 BCE and no later than 550 BCE making it possibly the world's oldest known mint. This means that it is possible that the earliest known coinage was invented by the Chinese and not the Lydians as is commonly believed.

== Cleaning of coins by Chinese archaeologists ==
As Chinese archaeologists frequently unearth ancient Chinese cash coins and other forms of historical currency at tomb sites, these unearthed bronze coinages are often severely corroded because they have been buried for hundreds or thousands of years, this sometimes means that the inscriptions on them can't be read. While archaeologists working at a site tend to do everything very slowly and do it as methodically as possible to avoid doing any damage to the buried cultural relics, this approach isn't taken with cash coins because they are often vital to date the tombs or ruins. With ancient Chinese cash coins archaeologists tend to be less concerned about their preservation and clean them to identify them.

To clean bronze cash coins Chinese archaeologists will simply put them in a mild acid like vinegar to soak for a period of 2 or 3 days, after this process is done the surface dirt and some of the corrosion will be removed. The cash coins are then removed by the person doing the cleaning, and they will them scrape out any leftover corrosion in the Chinese characters by using a (common) toothpick. After this process is done, a rubbing is usually made of the unearthed coins.

On the contrary, it is usually said among coin collectors to not clean their coins because the cleaning process will often lessen the coin's market value or in some cases even ruin it.

Because of the high frequency of the discovery of coin hoards in China uncleaned coin hoards from other countries are often sent to China for cleaning and assessment. For example, someone discovered a hoard of group of around 400 different 8 reales coins on the border between Mexico and the central American country of Guatemala. These silver coins were mostly produced by the Guatemala mint with others produced by the Mexico and Lima mints, all of which contained portraits of kings Charles IV and Ferdinand VII. As these coins were all too unclean to be deemed "valuable" by coin collectors they were sent to a coin dealer in the Jiangsu, People's Republic of China. Such situations are common as Chinese coin dealers have become experts in removing corrosion from coins to get them graded by numismatic experts and then be sold into the retail market.

== 19th century ==
List of 19th century coin hoards in the Qing dynasty
Date of discovery	Place of discovery	Image	Content	Long description of the find and notes	Date (if known)	Current location (if known)
1820s	Ling-shih-hsien District, Shanxi Province		16 Roman coins.	On 8 May 1886 the Deseret News reported: "Dr. Bushell of the British Legation at Peking, has prepared a monograph on some ancient Roman coins found in Shansi. The coins, 16 in number, were discovered, some 60 years ago, buried in the ground in the district of Ling-shih-hsien: it is known that there was constant intercourse and trade between China and the Roman empire during the first three centuries of the Christian era, and the coins, as identified by Dr. Bushell, date from Tiberius (A. D. 14-37) to Aurelianus (A. D. 270-275). Dr. Bushell says that he has heard of only one other instance of the discovery of Roman coins in China. That was when two were bought by Mr. Lyall at a wayside stall in Tien-Tsin, the Shansi coins presented "every appearance of having been buried, and no attempt had been made to remove the patina to read the legends." Dr. Bushell pronounces them genuine beyond all question, and says that he doubts whether "one of the best modern engravers, with all the appliances at his command, could produce a head equal to that on the coin of Commodus" (A. D. 180-192)."		

== 1950s ==
=== 1950s (Mainland China) ===
List of 1950s coin hoards in Mainland China
Date of discovery	Place of discovery	Image	Content	Long description of the find and notes	Date (if known)	Current location (if known)
1950s	Xi'an, Shaanxi		Ban Liang (半兩) cash coins	During the 1950s, a number of Ban Liang (半兩) cash coins were unearthed at a site somewhere near the city of Xi'an, Shaanxi. Among the excavated cash coins was one notable silver specimen, this cash coin notably has a diameter of 66 millimetres (2.6 in), a thickness of 7 millimetres (0.28 in), and a weight of 96.15 grams (3.392 oz), compared to most State of Qin Ban Liang cash coins made from bronze which typically have a diameter between 32 and 34 millimetres (1.3 and 1.3 in) and weigh only 8 grams (0.28 oz).	Warring States period	
1955–1959	Hengyang and Changsha, Hunan		Iron Ban Liang (半兩) cash coins	Between the years 1955 and 1959 a number of iron Ban Liang cash coins were unearthed in Western Han dynasty era tombs in the Hunanese cities of Hengyang and Changsha. These hoards point out to the possibility that China has used iron cash coins over a millennium before the Northern Song dynasty, as was traditionally thought before these discoveries.	Western Han dynasty period	

=== 1953 ===
==== 1953 (Mainland China) ====
List of 1953 coin hoards in Mainland China
Date of discovery	Place of discovery	Image	Content	Long description of the find and notes	Date (if known)	Current location (if known)
December 1953	Suburban Guangzhou, Guangdong province		20 catties of Qianheng Zhongbao (乾亨重寳) cash coins.	In December 1953, at the construction site of new buildings in the eastern suburbs of Guangzhou, construction workers employed by at the Mayugang (孖鱼冈) new village construction site discovered a pile of lead Qianheng Zhongbao (乾亨重寳) cash coins, weighing as much as 20 catties, was found buried in a small underground pit. No ancient tombs or other artifacts were found. The construction workers took out the coins and sent them to the Municipal Cultural Management Committee for preservation. This would prove the first discovery, as between December 1953 and 1958 a total of a total of 1200 catties worth of lead cash coins dated to the Southern Han period would be unearthed in Guangzhou.	Southern Han period	

== 1960s ==
=== 1960s (Mainland China) ===
List of 1960s coin hoards in Mainland China
Date of discovery	Place of discovery	Image	Content	Long description of the find and notes	Date (if known)	Current location (if known)
1960s	Jinshi City, Hunan		6 gold coins produced by the Delhi Sultanate	During the 1960s six gold coins were discovered buried in a small white glazed pot at a farm in Jinshi City, Hunan. These gold coins are now classified as first-level national cultural relics (国家一级文物). During the 1980s these gold coins were moved to the museum of Jinshi City. Peng Jia (彭佳), Director of the Cultural Relics Bureau of Jinshi City noted that these gold coins were produced by the Delhi Sultanate during the time that China was under Mongol domination. The obverse of the coins contain the name of the reigning sultan written in a "rare form" of Arabic script.	Mid-Yuan dynasty period	The Museum of Jinshi City

=== 1960 ===
==== 1960 (Mainland China) ====
List of 1960 coin hoards in Mainland China
Date of discovery	Place of discovery	Image	Content	Long description of the find and notes	Date (if known)	Current location (if known)
September 1960	Luanping County, Hebei province		A number of knife coins.	In 1960 it was reported by the Toledo Blade that a number of knife coins dating to the Warring States period were unearthed in Luanping County, Hebei province. Among the hoard were also a number of other items including kitchen utensils, bricks, tiles, bronze mirrors, agate beads coln, and copper coins.	4th century BC	

=== 1969 ===
==== 1969 (Taiwan) ====
List of 1969 coin hoards in the free area of the Republic of China
Date of discovery	Place of discovery	Image	Content	Long description of the find and notes	Date (if known)	Current location (if known)
January 1969	Kinmen, Fujian Province		Over 3000 cash coins produced between the years 971 and 1240.	In 1969, workers digging for a construction project on Quemoy island discovered 2 pottery jars with over 3000 cash coins dated to the Song dynasty.	13th century	

== 1970s ==
=== 1970s (Mainland China) ===
List of unspecified 1970s coin hoards in Mainland China
Date of discovery	Place of discovery	Image	Content	Long description of the find and notes	Date (if known)	Current location (if known)
The early 1970s	Chengtian Temple, Quanzhou, Fujian		Yonglong Tongbao (永隆通寶) clay moulds	During the early 1970s a number of Yonglong Tongbao (永隆通寶) clay moulds (traditional Chinese: 錢陶範; simplified Chinese: 钱陶范; pinyin: Qián táo fàn) were uncovered at the Chengtian Temple in Quanzhou, Fujian. The clay moulds date to the Kingdom of Min during the Five Dynasties and Ten Kingdoms period and all display the inscription Yonglong Tongbao. The clay moulds were discovered by a group of Buddhist monks digging in the courtyard in, to bury jars of a local Quanzhou-based traditional Chinese medicine known as "golden juice" (Chinese: 金汁; pinyin: jīn zhī), the elixir is made by mixing together the excrements of young (preadolescent) boys, spring water and "red soil" (traditional Chinese: 紅土; simplified Chinese: 红土; pinyin: hóng tǔ). After being prepared the solution is then stored inside a clay jar which is buried underground at a depth of approximately 3 meters. The clay jars are then left underground for a period of between 30 and 40 years, after which they are dug back up. "golden juice" as a form of "medicine" is taken orally and within traditional Chinese medicine it is considered to be particularly useful in the treatment of high fevers. While the initial clay moulds were uncovered during the early 1970s, it wasn't until the year 2002 when archeologists would formally excavate the site looking for more coin moulds. Yonglong Tongbao cash coins themselves today are very rare. There are only two specimens of them known to exist in Chinese museums and perhaps only about 100 specimens of Yonglong Tongbao cash coins are known to be in the hands of private Chinese coin collectors. Cash coins with this inscriptions were mostly made from iron, while an even smaller number of lead variants of them are known to exist. The reason as to why Yonglong Tongbao cash coins are so scarce has to do with the short period of time they were cast, which was only 1 year and 7 months. Furthermore they are even rarer because of the facts that iron suffers from oxidation and deteriorates, the limited area in which the Yonglong Tongbao cash coins had circulated, and their intricate method of production.	Five Dynasties and Ten Kingdoms period	

=== 1972 ===
==== 1972 (Mainland China) ====
List of 1972 coin hoards in Mainland China
Date of discovery	Place of discovery	Image	Content	Long description of the find and notes	Date (if known)	Current location (if known)
1972	Liao Shangjing site, Lindong, Baarin Left Banner, Inner Mongolia		A Da'an Baoqian (大安寶錢, 𘜶𗵐𘏨𘔭) cash coin	In the year 1972 a Da'an Baoqian (大安寶錢, 𘜶𗵐𘏨𘔭) cash coin with Tangut script was found at the Liao Shangjing site, Lindong, Baarin Left Banner, Inner Mongolia.	Liao dynasty period	The Liao Shangjing Museum

=== 1974 ===
==== 1974 (Mainland China) ====
List of 1974 coin hoards in Mainland China
Date of discovery	Place of discovery	Image	Content	Long description of the find and notes	Date (if known)	Current location (if known)
1974	Fugou County, Henan		18 specimens of spade money.	In the year 1974, a farmer in Fugou County, Henan, had unearthed a bronze three-legged tripod (鼎, dǐng). Stashed inside this bronze tripod were eighteen specimens of spade money. 1 of these spades was a hollow-handled spade (空首幣), while all the remaining 17 spade money were flat-handled spades (平首幣). All of these unearthed spades are notably made of silver and are now on display at the Henan Museum. This also notably makes it China's first ever recorded instance of silver coinage, according to an article in "China Numismatics Volume 3 of 1983" (traditional Chinese: 中國錢幣 1983年第3期; simplified Chinese: 中国钱币 1983年第3期; pinyin: zhōng guó qián bì yì qiān jiǔ bǎi bā shí sān nián dì sān qī).	Warring States period	The Henan Museum

=== 1976 ===
==== 1976 (Mainland China) ====
List of 1976 coin hoards in Mainland China
Date of discovery	Place of discovery	Image	Content	Long description of the find and notes	Date (if known)	Current location (if known)
25 October 1976	Puhechuan (蒲河川), Zhongtai Commune, Lingtai County, Gansu Province		Lead cake coins with foreign Inscriptions.	On 25 October 1976, members of the Zhongtai Commune in the Lingtai County, Gansu Province discovered a batch of lead cakes with foreign Inscriptions, while working on construction at a farm. A local county museum immediately sent people to clean the lead cake coins. The lead cake were buried inside of a platform close to a mountain, at a depth of about 1 metre (3 ft 3 in) underground, surrounded by black and red soil. In the pit, where the lead cake was unearthed, there were scattered fist-sized bluestones, about 33 centimetres (13 in) thick, with the stones facing east and west. Four rows of lead cakes were placed in the tile, divided into upper and lower layers. The lead cake coins were nearly arranged.		

=== 1977 ===
==== 1977 (Mainland China) ====
List of 1977 coin hoards in Mainland China
Date of discovery	Place of discovery	Image	Content	Long description of the find and notes	Date (if known)	Current location (if known)
May 15, 1977	1 kilometer west of the Liao Shangjing site, Lindong, Baarin Left Banner, Inner Mongolia		A cash coin with Khitan large script.	On May 15, 1977, a cash coin with Khitan large script was found 1 kilometer west of the Liao Shangjing site, Lindong, Baarin Left Banner, Inner Mongolia by Shi Yuilan. The inscription of the coin, "", has been interpret as meaning Tianchao Wanshun (天朝萬順, "Heavenly Dynasty — Myriad [affairs are] Favourable").	Liao dynasty period	The Liao Shangjing Museum
July 1977	Inner Mongolia		A number of gold Eastern Roman coins and 4 silver Sasanian coins.	In July 1977 Reuters Hong Kong reported that a Chinese archeologist had discovered a number of gold coins from the Eastern Roman Empire, including 1 produced during the reign of Leo I. The find also included 4 silver Persian coins dated to the Sasanian dynasty.		

=== 1979 ===
==== 1979 (Mainland China) ====
List of 1979 coin hoards in Mainland China
Date of discovery	Place of discovery	Image	Content	Long description of the find and notes	Date (if known)	Current location (if known)
October 1979	Jiangjia Village, Sanjian Town, Lushunkou District, Dalian, Liaoning Province		3 currency cellars dating to the Warring States period containing around 400 Yan (匽) knife coins.	In 1979, 3 currency cellars were uncovered in Jiangjia Village, Lushunkou District, Dalian, Liaoning Province by local villagers. A number of knife coins with the inscription "匽" (Yan) were discovered 50 centimetres (20 in) below the surface. The hoard contains about 400 pieces of knife coins with the Chinese character "匽", which can be divided into four types according to the shape and character composition. Type 1: the back is rounded, the blade is curved, the head of the knife is wide, slightly straight, the blade is wide, and the 2 vertical lines on the handle do not extend to the blade. The outer strokes of the character "匽" (Yan) on the obverse Inscription (legend) are round and drooping, the inner strokes are curved in a short oblique arc, and the character "日" (Ri) in the middle is extremely round. There are "eight" characters on the reverse side. The overall length of Type 1 is 13.8, the width of the blade is 2 centimetres (0.79 in), and they weigh 14.7 grams (0.52 oz).	Warring States period	

== 1980s ==
=== 1980 ===
==== 1980 (Mainland China) ====
List of 1980 coin hoards in Mainland China
Date of discovery	Place of discovery	Image	Content	Long description of the find and notes	Date (if known)	Current location (if known)
1980	Xianyang, Shaanxi		A golden Wu Zhu (五銖) cash coin.	In 1980, a golden Wu Zhu cash coin was unearthed in the prefecture-level city of Xianyang in province of Shaanxi. This golden cash coin is 2.6 centimetres (1.0 in) in diameter and was cast during the Western Han dynasty period.	202—8 BC	National Museum of China (中国国家博物馆)
1980	Meihua Village (梅花村), Dongshan District (东山), Guangzhou City (广州市), Guangdong		A jar containing around 20 kilograms (44 lb) of lead Qianheng Zhongbao (乾亨重寶) cash coins.	In 1980, when the Administrative Office of the General Office of the Guangdong Provincial Committee of the Chinese Communist Party was carrying out residential construction in Meihua Village (梅花村), Dongshan District (东山), Guangzhou City (广州市) in the Guangdong province, a four-eared black-glazed pot weighing about 20 kg was found 1.2 meters below the ground. The pot contained a batch of lead cash coins with the inscription Qianheng Zhongbao (乾亨重寶) dated to the Southern Han Kingdom. The lead cash coins were placed vertically and bonded together inside of the pot and all of them suffered from corrosion. All lead cash coins in the hoard seem to be divided into two specifications, one with a diameter of 2.5–2.6 centimetres (0.98–1.02 in), and the other with a diameter of 2.5–2.7 centimetres (0.98–1.06 in). The reverse sides of all these cash coins are blank. The thickness of the cash coins is uneven, and their casting quality is very poor.	Southern Han dynasty period	
July 1980	Beiheng Lane, Guiyang, Guizhou Province		Qing dynasty period silver sycees.	In July 1980, residents of Beiheng Lane, Zhonghua North Road, Guiyang City dug up a batch of silver ingots when they were digging the foundation on the side of a building. While digging a batch of silver ingots were uncovered, and the silver ingots were immediately brought to the police station. This hoard of unearthed silver ingots was found inside of a pot found at a depth of 0.3 metres (12 in) below the surface. Based on this, it is speculated that this is a batch of silver ingots that was originally stored in a cellar. This hoard contains a total of 31 silver ingots, with a total weight of 41.2 catties (20.6 kilograms [45 lb]). The shapes of the sycees range with some of them being shaped like a horseshoe, a rectangular girdle, a square bucket or being circular in shape.	Qing dynasty period	

=== 1982 ===
==== 1982 (Mainland China) ====
List of 1982 coin hoards in Mainland China
Date of discovery	Place of discovery	Image	Content	Long description of the find and notes	Date (if known)	Current location (if known)
Autumn 1982	Tieshijing Village, Xiaodong, Shiwangxu, Yangchun County, Guangdong Province		Over 10 stone Qianheng Zhongbao (乾亨重寳) cash coins.	In 1982, the cultural relics census team of Yangchun County found more than ten Qianheng Zhongbao (乾亨重寳) stone cash coins (石質錢) of the Southern Han Dynasty in the Tieshijing Village. The Guangdong Provincial Museum immediately sent personnel to investigate and conduct a small-scale trial excavation.	Southern Han dynasty period	

=== 1983 ===
==== 1983 (Mainland China) ====
List of 1983 coin hoards in Mainland China
Date of discovery	Place of discovery	Image	Content	Long description of the find and notes	Date (if known)	Current location (if known)
1983	A tomb in a suburb of Guyuan City, Ningxia Hui Autonomous Region		Persian and Roman coins.	In 1983 a large number of silver Persian coins and golden Roman imperial coins were found alongside a gold and silver kettle depicting the Trojan War in a tomb in Guyuan City, Ningxia Hui Autonomous Region. The kettle is attributed to the Sassanian period in Persian history. The tomb was later attributed to Great Zhuguo General Li Xian and his wife Wu Hui of Beizhou.	Northern and Southern dynasties period	
22 April 1983	Shijiazhuang, Hebei Province		48,899 Kaiyuan Tongbao cash coins weighing 375 catties.	On 22 April 1983, Jiang Shuguang (蒋曙光), a member of the Nangaoying Brigade of Taoyuan Commune in the suburbs of Shijiazhuang, and others dug up a gray urn. The urn was found 1.5 metres (4 ft 11 in) in the ground. The pottery urn was broken when it was unearthed, and the urn was filled with Tang dynasty period cash coins. This hoard of cash coins weighed 375 catties (187.5 kilograms [413 lb]), and contained nearly 50,000 individual pieces. The Shijiazhuang City Cultural Relics Preservation Office (石家庄市文物保管所对其进行) sorted them out. They described a total of 48,899 pieces of Kaiyuan Tongbao cash coins, which can be divided into two types. Type I was counted at 33,093 pieces.		

=== 1984 ===
==== 1984 (Mainland China) ====
List of 1984 coin hoards in Mainland China
Date of discovery	Place of discovery	Image	Content	Long description of the find and notes	Date (if known)	Current location (if known)
1984	Ningxia Hui Autonomous Region		A cache of Chinese cash coins.	In the year 1984 when a cache of cash coins was unearthed in the Ningxia Hui Autonomous Region. This discovery is notably for including a Western Xia cash coin with the Guangding Yuanbao (光定元寶) that was written in seal script. Up until this point no Tangut Western Xia dynasty cash coins with seal script inscriptions were known to exist. The seal script Guangding Yuanbao cash coin has a diameter of 25.3 millimetres (1.00 in), a thickness of 1.4 millimetres (0.055 in), and weighs 4.3 grams (0.15 oz).	Western Xia dynasty period	
1984	Hexian County, Anhui Province		A number of ancient coins.	In 1984, a hoard of coins was discovered in a cellar in Hexian County, Anhui Province.		
July 1984	Xiayu Village, Linglongshan Township, Lin'an County, Zhejiang Province		2360 coins weighing 17 kilograms (37 lb).	In July 1984, while excavating soil from the brick and tile factory in Xiayu Village, Linglongshan Township, 10 kilometres (6.2 mi) southwest of Lin'an County, a cellar of copper-alloy cash coins was found. The copper-alloy coins were stored at a depth of 1.3 metres (4 ft 3 in) below the surface. Due to serious corrosion, all the coins were lumped together. After three times of sorting and processing, the archeologists counted a total of 2360 cash coins, weighing 17 kilograms (37 lb). Of these coins, 1049 can be identified, 2 of which are Wu Zhu cash coins dated to the Han dynasty.	Yuan dynasty period	

=== 1986 ===
==== 1986 (Mainland China) ====
List of 1986 coin hoards in Mainland China
Date of discovery	Place of discovery	Image	Content	Long description of the find and notes	Date (if known)	Current location (if known)
1986	Jingxing County, Hebei province		Over 520 different kinds of cash coins ranging from 206 BC to 1234 AD.	In September 1986 Lakeland Ledger reported that a peasant named Fan Zengbao had found a hoard consisting of over 520 different kinds of ancient Chinese coins while digging the foundation for his new house in Jingxing County, Hebei province. The coins were attributed to a total of 18 different dynasties as well as various regimes from ethnic minorities, ranging from the Western Han dynasty to the Jurchen-led Jin dynasty, covering a period from 206 BC to 1234 AD. A number of the discovered cash coins were reported as being unique and this hoard was reported as going to provide new clues to the study of ancient northern Chinese numismatics.		

=== 1987 ===
==== 1987 (Mainland China) ====
List of 1987 coin hoards in Mainland China
Date of discovery	Place of discovery	Image	Content	Long description of the find and notes	Date (if known)	Current location (if known)
1987	Shaanxi province		A number of unusual Wu Zhu (五銖) cash coins.	A coin hoard in the Shaanxi province included a number of Wu Zhu cash coins. One of the Wu Zhu cash coins discovered in this hoard has one square-like projections extending beyond the normal border of the square central hole. Several of the cash coins found in this hoard have triangular-shaped projections extending beyond the border of the inner hole. These cash coins did not show any indication that the holes were modified by force at some time after their casting meaning that these abnormal shapes were not made after the production but during.		
5–12 May 1987	Famen Temple, Famen town, Fufeng County, Shaanxi		2,499 treasures from the Tang dynasty including gems, jewelry, art pieces, gold and silver utensils, and numerous silk fabrics woven with gold thread. This fine included more than 27,000 coins, mostly consisting of Tang dynasty period Kaiyuan Tongbao (開元通寶) and Qianyuan Zhongbao (乾元重寶) cash coins, including 13 Kaiyuan Tongbao turtle shell coins (traditional Chinese: 玳瑁幣; simplified Chinese: 玳瑁币; pinyin: Dàimào bì).	In 1987, during a renovation of the Famen Temple, a previously undiscovered underground "palace" was discovered under the foundation of the pagoda, this underground complex contained an intact and secret vaunt that had remained untouched by grave robbers and looters. The renovation took place after a large part of the pagoda collapsed due to heave rains in 1981, when the renovation started 6 years later the foundation of the wooden pagoda dating to the Tang dynasty period was discovered underneath the foundation of the damaged brick pagoda. This discovery included many different treasures including the middle finger bone of the Buddha's left hand. This discovery did not come as a complete surprise, however, because historical documents clearly recorded that this "true relic" (traditional Chinese: 靈骨; simplified Chinese: 灵骨; pinyin: Líng gǔ) that was kept at the Famen Temple during the Tang period. Many of the other cultural relics found in the underground palace date to the year 874 CE, which was the date when the chamber door was last reported to have been closed. Meaning that the underground palace remained hidden for 1,113 years. Among these finds there were over 27,000 cash coins dated to the Tang dynasty and 13 turtle shell cash coins made from Hawksbill sea turtle shell. These cash coins are the first turtle shell coins discovered in China and these may also be the oldest coins made of turtle shell ever found anywhere in the world. Because they all have the inscription "Kaiyuan Tongbao", they are dated to the Tang dynasty period alongside the rest or the discovered found treasures. As there is no mention of turtle shell coins being produced in any Tang dynasty historical texts, little else is known of their actual origin.	874 CE	Famen Temple Cultural Scenic Area (法门寺文化景区).

== 1990s ==
=== 1990s (Mainland China) ===
List of unspecified 1990s coin hoards in Mainland China
Date of discovery	Place of discovery	Image	Content	Long description of the find and notes	Date (if known)	Current location (if known)
1990s	Hexigten Banner, Inner Mongolia		A golden Tianchao Wanshun cash coin.	During the 1990s a small gold Tianchao Wanshun (天朝萬順) cash coin was discovered at Hexigten Banner, Inner Mongolia. The inscription of the cash coin is read counterclockwise. In the year 2017 it had an estimated market value of between ¥460,000 and ¥600,000.	Liao dynasty period	

=== 1990 ===
==== 1990 (Mainland China) ====
List of 1990 coin hoards in Mainland China
Date of discovery	Place of discovery	Image	Content	Long description of the find and notes	Date (if known)	Current location (if known)
1990	Near Xi'an, Shaanxi		A Northern Zhou period coin tree.	A coin tree produced between the years 557 and 581 was discovered near the city of Xi'an, Shaanxi. This find indicated that the sand casting method for the production of cash coins was applied much earlier than previously thought. As many scholars up until that point believed that the manufacturing method was likely created during the Sui dynasty period.	Northern Zhou period	

=== 1992 ===
==== 1992 (Mainland China) ====
List of 1992 coin hoards in Mainland China
Date of discovery	Place of discovery	Image	Content	Long description of the find and notes	Date (if known)	Current location (if known)
1992	Meitan County, Guizhou		4,600 catties of Chinese, Japanese, and Vietnamese cash coins, silver Yuan Shikai "fat man dollars", a 50 cm long sword, and a copy of the Classic of Poetry.	In the year 1992 a man named Wang Pinli (王品礼) in a very remote and relatively poor mountainous area of Meitan County, Guizhou suffered from a rat infestation in his house, when he decided to fill the holes in the area between the kitchen and the ox pen, while digging he had uncovered what he described as "a money pit" that is 1.5 metres (4 ft 11 in) in diameter and 2 metres (6 ft 7 in) in depth, the hoard includes cash coins from the Tang, Song, Ming, and Qing dynasties as well as Japanese cash coins (倭錢), Vietnamese cash coins, and silver Republican era dollars. There was more than 4,600 catties of coins inside of the "money pit", which is equivalent to about 3 tonnes (3.0 long tons; 3.3 short tons). Wang Pinli was able to sell the coins from the "coin pit" for 3–5 yuan per catty, which would be 13,800–23,000 yuan ($2,166–$3,610) for the whole "money pit", and used the money he made selling the coins to take care of the elder members of his family and to send his children to school. Wang Pinli managed to keep a number of the coins he uncovered, which were later used as toys by his children and were often found scattered across the house. Among the coins Wang Pinli kept are Kaiyuan Tongbao (開元通寶) cash coins from the Tang dynasty, Jingde Yuanbao (景德元寶), Yuanyou Tongbao (元祐通寶), and Zhenghe Tongbao (政和通寶) cash coins from the Song dynasty, Hongwu Tongbao (洪武通寶) and Wanli Tongbao (萬曆通寶) cash coins from the Ming dynasty, Honghua Tongbao (洪化通寶) cash coins issued by Wu Shifan, Kangxi Tongbao (康熙通寶) and Qianlong Tongbao (乾隆通寶) cash coins from the Manchu Qing dynasty, as well as non-Chinese cash coins such as the Vietnamese Cảnh Nguyên Thông Bảo (景元通寶, or "Jingyuan Tongbao") cash coin produced in 1377, and the Japanese Kan'ei Tsūhō (寛永通寳). Furthermore, the hoard includes a number of silver Yuan Shikai "fat man dollars" (袁大頭, yuán dà tóu), and a number of non-coin objects such as a 50 cm long sword and a copy of the Classic of Poetry.		
1992	Chenzhou, Hunan province		39 kilograms (86 lb) of coin clusters and scattered coins.	In 1992 a hoard of 39 kilograms (86 lb) of Kaiyuan Tongbao (開元通寶) cash coins was discovered in the city of Chenzhou in the southern Chinese province of Hunan. The number of cash coins in the hoard is approximately 8000.	Tang dynasty period	
17 August 1992	Shutang, Wangcheng District, Hunan province		A Kaiyuan Tongbao (開元通寶) clay coin mould.	Mr. Ceng Jingyi (曾敬仪), a retired teacher and coin collector, unearthed a Tang dynasty period clay coin mould (钱陶范) used to produce Kaiyuan Tongbao cash coins. This clay coin mould is today classified as a "national treasure" (国宝级) by the government of the People's Republic of China.	Tang dynasty period	"Exhibition of Chinese Ancient Coins" (中国历代钱币展), Ouyang Xun Cultural Park (欧阳询文化园), located in Shutang (书堂), Hunan province.

=== 1995 ===
==== 1995 (Taiwan) ====
List of 1995 coin hoards in the free area of the Republic of China
Date of discovery	Place of discovery	Image	Content	Long description of the find and notes	Date (if known)	Current location (if known)
1995	Shipwreck off the coast of the General Islet, Penghu County, Taiwan province		A number of Qianlong Tongbao (乾隆通寳) cash coins in an 18th century shipwreck.	In 1995 the Ministry of Education sent the NMH's Marine Archeology Team was sent to conduct preliminary excavations of "General No. 1". This excavation was done underwater after a number of fishermen from Penghu found the scattered remains of a seafaring vessel in 1994. The sunken sea vessel was named "General No. 1" after Penghu's General Islet, the site of the discovery. This team was the Republic of China's first underwater archaeology team, and consisted of deep-sea divers, historians, anthropologists, and archaeologists. During these underwater excavations the team managed to recover a total of 264 items from the shipwreck. These assets include various items such as blue and white porcelain bowls, porcelain spoons and saucers, pottery pots, bronze implements, and wooden cabin boards. The wreck was dated to the rule of the Qianlong Emperor because a number of Qianlong Tongbao (乾隆通寳) cash coins were excavated which confirmed that this was ship was once a commercial trading ship sailing between the mainland Chinese province of Fujian and the island of Taiwan during the 18th century.	Qianlong period (1735–1796)	

=== 1996 ===
==== 1996 (Mainland China) ====
List of 1996 coin hoards in Mainland China
Date of discovery	Place of discovery	Image	Content	Long description of the find and notes	Date (if known)	Current location (if known)
1996	The tomb of the Xianbei Northern Zhou dynasty prime minister Tian Hong		Five gold Eastern Roman coins.	In the year 1996 an excavation was conducted on the then recently discovered tomb of the Xianbei Northern Zhou dynasty prime minister Tian Hong, who died and was buried in the year 575 in Yuanzhou. The archaeological excavations of the area were started in the year 1995 and were partially funded as a joint project by the Japanese Ministry of Education, Culture, Sports, Science and Technology Grant – in Aid for International Scientific Research. During the excavation of Tian Hong's tomb it was evident that the tomb had been broken into by grave robbers on a large scale prior, the burial mound of the tomb is round in shape, and measures about 35 metres (115 ft) across. Furthermore, the tomb contains a cave – chamber tomb, which measures about 12 metres (39 ft) deep from the top of the tomb mound. Three coffins laid inside of the tomb, the ones belonging to Tian Hong and his wife were still intact but the third coffin had been scattered by grave robbers. Five gold Eastern Roman coins were found inside of the tomb. One coin was issued under Leo I, one under Justin I, two under Justinian I as co-emperor, and one under Justinian I as "the great". Other than the Eastern Roman coins other objects like Jade ornaments, wall paintings about 13 ministers, coloured in red, white, and black, numerous gold leafed glass beads, mica foils with papercutted gold, and painted pottery figures of some equestrians that was located in the eastern side chamber, one cook and two dogs in the fifth shaft of a tomb gallery were also recovered from Tian Hong's tomb.	575	

=== 1997 ===
==== 1997 (Mainland China) ====
List of 1997 coin hoards in Mainland China
Date of discovery	Place of discovery	Image	Content	Long description of the find and notes	Date (if known)	Current location (if known)
1997	Dongchuan, Sichuan		The largest Chinese "Mint opening commemorative coin" ever found.	It was reported in 1997 that at an unspecified date that the largest Chinese cash coin ever had been uncovered. The large cash coin in question was a Kai Lu Qian (traditional Chinese: 開爐錢; simplified Chinese: 开炉钱; pinyin: kāi lú qián), or "commemorative cash coins", were a special type of cash coin produced to commemorate the opening of a mint or a new furnace. The largest ever recorded of these cash coins, and also the largest and heaviest ancient Chinese coin ever found, was a giant Jiajing Tongbao (嘉靖通寶) cash coin produced for the opening of a mint in Dongchuan, Sichuan. This Kai Lu cash coin has a diameter of 57.8 centimeters (or 22.8 inches), a thickness of 3.7 centimeters (or 1.5 inches), and it has a weight of 41.5 kilograms (or 91.5 pounds). On June 27, 1990, the Quality Inspection Section of the Huize County Lead and Zinc Mine Archives (traditional Chinese: 會澤縣的鉛鋅礦檔案館; simplified Chinese: 会泽县的铅锌矿档案馆; pinyin: huì zé xiàn de qiān xīn kuàng dàng àn guǎn), where the cash coin is on display, conducted a sampling and analysis of the coin, conducted an assay and concluded that the coin had a composition of 90. 81% copper, 0. 584% aluminum, 0. 532% zinc, and 3% iron. In the year 2002 it was added to the Guinness World Records as the largest coin.	Ming Jiajing period	Huize County Lead and Zinc Mine Archives
March 1997	Hun river, Qingshuihe County, Inner Mongolia		A jar filled with Jurchen Jin dynasty cash coins and Zhouyuan Tongbao (周元通寳) cash coins.	In March 1997, on the bank of the Hun river in Qingshuihe County, Inner Mongolia, a jar of cash coins weighing 7 kilograms (15 lb) was unearthed. The jar contained over 30 Zhouyuan Tongbao (周元通寳) cash coins among other coins, with the Jurchen-led Jin dynasty period Dading Tongbao (大定通寶) being the latest. The cash coins stored in the jar are well preserved because they were buried in an arid and less rainy area.		
July 1997	Cangzhou, Hebei		A large amount of iron cash coins dating to the Song dynasty.	In July 1997 a large chunk of iron cash coins dating to the Song dynasty, described as a "mountain" of ancient Chinese cash coins, were unearthed in a field near the city of Cangzhou, Hebei. The discovered cash coins were made of iron and they tended to be stuck together in very large and often heavy pieces. The iron cash coins from the hoard are now displayed at the Tieqian Ku (铁钱库, "iron cash coins treasury") located in the city of Cangzhou.	Song dynasty period	The Tieqian Ku

=== 1999 ===
==== 1999 (Mainland China) ====
List of 1999 coin hoards in Mainland China
Date of discovery	Place of discovery	Image	Content	Long description of the find and notes	Date (if known)	Current location (if known)
1999			A Tangut script Zhengde Baoqian (正德寶錢, 𗣼𘇚𘏨𘔭) cash coin	In the year 1999 a Tangut script Zhengde Baoqian (正德寶錢, 𗣼𘇚𘏨𘔭) cash coin from the Western Xia dynasty was discovered. This coin is notably the only Zhengde Baoqian cash coin ever found. Its market value was estimated at 200,000 yuan in 2005.	Western Xia dynasty period	

== 2000s ==
=== 2000 ===
==== 2000 (Mainland China) ====
List of 2000 coin hoards in Mainland China
Date of discovery	Place of discovery	Image	Content	Long description of the find and notes	Date (if known)	Current location (if known)
May 20, 2000	Cangzhou, Hebei		48 tonnes of iron cash coins.	In a report by the People's Daily dated May 20, 2000, another hoard of iron cash coins was found in a field near Cangzhou, Hebei, at the same location as in 1997. The iron cash coins dated to the Northern Song dynasty period. The discovery was made by a local tourism department of Cangzhou city. The archeologists had initially dug up about 48 tonnes (53 short tons; 47 long tons) of iron cash coins, with the largest single chunk them weighing about 7 tonnes (6.9 long tons; 7.7 short tons). The hoard was a breakthrough because never before were any iron cash coins discovered in northern China. Before this hoard, historians believed that iron cash coins were only used in regions where commerce flourished south of the Yangtze River. The archaeologists also found out that the Northern Song iron cash coins at the site had not simply rusted together but displayed clear signs that they had been melted together. Furthermore, at the site the archeologists also found some coin moulds and stoves that may suggest that a mint may have been located there in the past. However, some experts refuted this hypothesis because this area was part of a frontier region during the Song dynasty period and the Song government would in all likelihood not have built a coin mint in a remote border area like this. Contemporary experts noted that this coin hoard would re-write China's history of coin production. Why such a large quantity of Song dynasty period iron cash coins were buried in the area near Cangzhou and why these iron coins had apparently been melted together in such large chunks remains a mystery. According to Ms. Wang Yufang (王玉芳), the Director of the Cangzhou City Bureau of Cultural Relics (沧州市文物局), there are no historical documents dating to the Song dynasty that mention the existence of this iron cash coin cache. The most plausible hypothesis as to why these iron cash coins were located in such large quantities and why they were (partially) melted together claims that iron cash coins were sent to the area by the government of the Song dynasty to pay for military expenses contending for control of the Sixteen Prefectures against the Jurchens. The Song army was eventually defeated during this campaign. As they were forced to withdraw from the region, the Song army was faced with the prospect of having to transport such an enormous quantity of iron cash coins during their retreat. Since the transport of the iron cash coins would have been difficult to achieve, and given the fact that it was necessary them to make a hasty retreat, it is hypothesised that a decision was made by the Song army to abandon the huge amounts of money in the area, and that they were partially melted down to prevent the iron cash coinage from falling into the hands of the advancing enemy soldiers. The iron cash coins from the hoard are now displayed at the Tieqian Ku (铁钱库, "iron cash coins treasury") located in the city of Cangzhou.	Song dynasty period	The Tieqian Ku

==== 2000 (Hong Kong) ====
List of 2000 coin hoards in Hong Kong
Date of discovery	Place of discovery	Image	Content	Long description of the find and notes	Date (if known)	Current location (if known)
2000	So Kwun Wat, Tuen Mun, Hong Kong		Over 60 Han dynasty period cash coins.	In the year 2000 at the archeological site of So Kwun Wat, Tuen Mun in the special administrative region of Hong Kong over sixty Han dynasty era bronze cash coins were unearthed which included both Ban Liang (半兩) and Wu Zhu (五銖) cash coins, among the hoard were also pieces of linen and bamboo mats.	Han dynasty period	

=== 2002 ===
==== 2002 (Mainland China) ====
List of 2002 coin hoards in Mainland China
Date of discovery	Place of discovery	Image	Content	Long description of the find and notes	Date (if known)	Current location (if known)
2002	Shaanxi		A seal script Guangding Yuanbao (光定元寶) cash coin issued by the Tangut Western Xia Empire.	In 2002 a second specimen of the Western Xia seal script Guangding Yuanbao (光定元寶) cash coins was unearthed in Shaanxi, later a third specimen would be unearthed in Inner Mongolia.	Western Xia dynasty period	
April 2002	Chengtian Temple, Quanzhou, Fujian		Yonglong Tongbao (永隆通寶) clay moulds	In April 2002 archeologists had begun a formal excavation at the Chengtian Temple in Quanzhou, Fujian, where three decades earlier a number of Kingdom of Min period Yonglong Tongbao (永隆通寶) clay moulds had been uncovered. At a depth of about 3 metres (9.8 ft) the archeologists had discovered over a thousand clay mould fragments at the location. While it known that the Min Kingdom had a mint, its exact location was unknown, but due to the discovery of such a large number of clay mould fragments discovered at the Chengtian Temple confirms that the mint was located somewhere in present-day Quanzhou, making it only known mint location from the Five Dynasties and Ten Kingdoms period at the time. The archaeologists considered this hoard to be particularly fortunate, as it is rare for such cultural objects made from clay to survive in climates that receive over 1,200 millimetres (47 in) of rain annually such as Quanzhou. This fact is cited to be one of the important reasons as to why no other sites which cast cash coins using clay moulds have been discovered in the modern period this far into southern China. Iron was used to cast cash coins by the Min Kingdom in the area because the region where Quanzhou is situated had ample supplies of iron and coal but lacked any copper reserves. As to why such a large quantity of clay moulds were discovered at the Chengtian Temple us because the casting method that was employed by the Min Kingdom at the time required a two-piece clay mould was made with a small hole in which the molten iron, with a temperature of at least 1,535 °C (2,795 °F), could be poured into them. Once the iron had hardened, forming the cash coin, the clay mould had to be broken apart to take the cash coin out. Each clay mould could was only capable to produce a single cash coin. Furthermore, the archaeologists noted that while the casting technique for manufacturing cash coins had remained the same as it had in ancient times, the casting technology itself had evolved to the point where the Chinese character inscriptions displayed on the coinage could now be clearly cast.	Five Dynasties and Ten Kingdoms period	

=== 2003 ===
==== 2003 (Mainland China) ====
List of 2003 coin hoards in Mainland China
Date of discovery	Place of discovery	Image	Content	Long description of the find and notes	Date (if known)	Current location (if known)
2003	Suburbs of Jinan, Shandong Province		150 kilograms of ancient cash coins.	In the winter of 2003, a batch of ancient coins was unearthed in the suburbs of Jinan, Shandong Province. Among the about 150 kilograms (330 lb) of ancient cash coins seen (a lot of rusted and knotted together, keeping the shape of money strings), Song dynasty period cash coins accounted for the vast majority. The latest Inscription found in the hoard is the Chunxi Yuanbao (淳熙元寳), issued during the reign of Emperor Xiaozong of the Southern Song Dynasty, which was folded into two coins with "Eleven" (十一) on the back, meaning that this cash coin was cast in 1184.	Sometime after 1184.	
2003	Luopu County, Hotan Prefecture, Xinjiang Uygur Autonomous Region		Copper-alloy and lead coins.	In 2003, Ziquan Neihua (兹泉内化) copper-alloy coins and a number of lead cash coins were found in the ancient ruins of the Taklamakan Desert in Luopu County, Xinjiang Uygur Autonomous Region.		
February 2003	Henan province		Hundreds of Eastern Han dynasty period Wu Zhu (五銖) cash coins.	In February 2003 a coin hoard consisting of several hundreds of Wu Zhu cash coins held in a string by rope.	Eastern Han dynasty period	

=== 2005 ===
==== 2005 (Mainland China) ====
List of 2005 coin hoards in Mainland China
Date of discovery	Place of discovery	Image	Content	Long description of the find and notes	Date (if known)	Current location (if known)
2005	Hangzhou, Zhejiang		10 Mexican silver coins	In the year 2005 ten silver Mexican 8 reales coins were unearthed at an archeological site in the city of Hangzhou, Zhejiang. The front side of these silver coins depict an eagle devouring a snake, perched on a prickly pear cactus. Its reverse side features a liberty cap and the word "Libertad". These silver coins were a part of a bride's dowry.	19th century	Long Museum, West Bund, Shanghai
2005	Zhangjichang Village, Liuyangbao Township, Yanchi County, Ningxia Hui Autonomous Region		Lead cash coins dated to the Western Han dynasty period.	In 2005, lead cash coins were found in the Zhangjichang Village in Ningxia Hui Autonomous Region, a small rural village with only a hundred people located at the foot of the Great Wall.		

=== 2006 ===
==== 2006 (Mainland China) ====
List of 2006 coin hoards in Mainland China
Date of discovery	Place of discovery	Image	Content	Long description of the find and notes	Date (if known)	Current location (if known)
2006	Zhongguan minting site, Shaanxi Province		Wu Zhu (五銖) cash coins dating to the Western Han dynasty period.	In 2006 a number of Wu Zhu cash coins were discovered during the archeological investigation of the Zhongguan minting site, located 25 kilometres (16 mi) west from Xi'an, Shaanxi. The total area of the archeological site is the biggest ancient Chinese site found at the time, covering an area over 900,000 square metres (9,700,000 sq ft), measuring around 600 metres (2,000 ft) from the east to the west and around 1,500 metres (4,900 ft) from the south to the north. The cash coins were excavated from depths ranging from 100 to 200 centimetres (39 to 79 in) underground.	Western Han dynasty period	
January 2006	Xi'an, Shaanxi		150 different coins issued by different dynasties in Chinese history	In January 2006 archaeologists had discovered a tomb in Xi'an, Shaanxi that was possibly the resting place of a coin collector who died 600 years prior to its discovery. A total of 150 different coins issued by different dynasties in Chinese history were found inside of the tomb which led the archaeologists to believe that the man was interested in ancient coins.	15th century	
January 2006	Pingli County, Shaanxi		259 Wu Zhu cash coins	In January 2006 during the construction of a plaza in Pingli County, Shaanxi a Han dynasty era tomb was uncovered, during its excavation archeologists found 259 Wu Zhu cash coins, 1 tripod made from iron, a pottery kitchen range as well as 3 pottery urns.		
Sunday May 7, 2006	Pucheng County, Shaanxi		A tonne of Northern Song dynasty period cash coins.	It was reported on Friday May 16, 2006, by the Xinhua News Agency that on Sunday May 7, 2006, a tonne of ancient Chinese cash coins were unearthed at a construction site in Pucheng County, Shaanxi. The coin hoard was uncovered about 6 to 7 metres (20 to 23 ft) underground inside of a brick cellar when an excavator was stumbled across it. According to a witness at the site the brick cellar was full of cash coins that were scattered around and other coins were bunched together with rotten leather strips. After the local authorities on cultural relics had put the uncovered cash coins under their protection they identified that some were produced during the Northern Song dynasty period, while other cash coins could not be identified because of erosion.	Northern Song dynasty period	
July 11, 2006	Shijiazhuang, Hebei		A cache of Qing dynasty period cash coins.	It was reported on July 11, 2006, by the Xinhua News Agency that construction workers had stumbled across a coin hoard in Shijiazhuang, Hebei. Archeologists suspect that the Qing dynasty period cash coins were buried underground there by a local bank in an effort to prevent robbery.	Qing dynasty period	
July 21, 2006	Xinzhen Village Dongying, Shandong		3 tonnes (3.0 long tons; 3.3 short tons) of iron cash coins.	It was reported on July 21, 2006, by China News that a Northern Song dynasty period site filled with cultural relics had been discovered during the construction of a building in Xinzhen Village Dongying, Shandong. Experts from Dongying Cultural Relics Bureau excavated the site and found 3 tonnes (3.0 long tons; 3.3 short tons) of iron cash coins as well as some copper-alloy coins. Further, the hoard included pottery head portraits of minority ethnic people, chinaware, and parts of ancient architecture.	Northern Song dynasty period	

=== 2007 ===
==== 2007 (Mainland China) ====
List of 2007 coin hoards in Mainland China
Date of discovery	Place of discovery	Image	Content	Long description of the find and notes	Date (if known)	Current location (if known)
2007	Longgang Town, Yancheng, Jiangsu		An undisclosed number of cash coins.	Village elders from Longgang Town, Yancheng, Jiangsu noted in a 2015 media report that that old coins were discovered in a river in the year 2007, where later in 2015 more cash coins would be found. In the distant past, a temple was situated on the site at the river. The temple was later destroyed at an undisclosed time but the cash coins unearthed at the site may be linked to the ancient temple that once stood there.	Song dynasty period	
2007	Shaanxi province		A silver Bai Jin San Pin (白金三品) coin with a horse pattern produced during the Han dynasty period.	In 2007 a silver Bai Jin San Pin (白金三品) coin with a horse pattern was discovered in the Shaanxi province. This find was notably the first silver Bai Jin San Pin that was ever found. Up until this point the only Bai Jin San Pin that were ever discovered were made of lead, these were initially found during the 1980s and confused numismatists because historical texts, such as the Records of the Grand Historian very clearly noted that these coins were made from a silver-tin alloy. This discovery proved the validity of the reported silver coins from the reign of Emperor Wu of Han. The horse Bai Jin San Pin is the second coin of the set mentioned in the records and is square in shape, weighs 6 taels (300 grams [11 oz]), and had a nominal value of 500 Ban Liang and Wu Zhu cash coins. The image of the horse represented the square earth. The description of the horse states that it has its "head upright, chest high, with three legs on the ground and one hoof raised, full of vigor and imposing momentum". The "square" horse Bai Jin San Pin coin together with the "round" dragon coin from the same series reflected the ancient Chinese theory of the "circle and square" where heaven (Tian) is represented by a circle and the flat earth (Di) by a square.	119–115 BC	
August 23, 2007	Qianwanhu Village, Changzi County, Shanxi		1.5 tonnes (1.5 long tons; 1.7 short tons) of Chinese cash coins dating from the Han to the Northern Song dynasty.	On August 23, 2007, a villager digging a channel to place pipes for tap water had found "money cellar" 1.5 metres (4 ft 11 in) containing 1.5 tonnes (1.5 long tons; 1.7 short tons) of ancient coins below the ground in Qianwanhu Village, Changzi County, Shanxi. According to Li Lin, an official of the Changzi Center of Cultural Heritage and Tourism, the "money cellar" contains around 10,000 coins and that they were piled orderly into a cuboid of 1.3 metres (4 ft 3 in) in length, 0.65 metres (2 ft 2 in) in width, and 1 metre (3 ft 3 in) in height. After they had been found, the cash coins were sent to the local authorities in charge of cultural relics. The reason as to why the cash coins were located there isn't known, but the archaeologists had made 3 hypotheses. The first hypothesis assumes that the cash coins were the private wealth of a landlord, the second hypothesis assumes that the cash coins from the "money cellar" were owned by ancient Chinese private banks who buried them during a war, while the third hypothesis assumes that the cash coins had belonged to rich people in the same scenario as the second hypothesis. The cash coins that were found are mostly from the Northern Song dynasty period, with some Han and Tang dynasty specimens being among them. Many of the unearthed cash coins are in good condition with readable characters, while others had been severely corroded. Li Lin noted that the largest cash coin found in the hoard is 3 centimetres (1.2 in) in diameter and that the smallest is only 1 centimetre (0.39 in) in diameter.	Northern Song dynasty period	

=== 2008 ===
==== 2008 (Mainland China) ====
List of 2008 coin hoards in Mainland China
Date of discovery	Place of discovery	Image	Content	Long description of the find and notes	Date (if known)	Current location (if known)
2008	Guangzhou, Guangdong		A minting site from the early Tang dynasty period.	During excavations conducted in the city of Guangzhou, Guangdong a minting site dated to the early Tang dynasty period was uncovered. As no contemporary government records mention a mint in the area the site likely belonged to a counterfeit ring. The site notably contains signs that the mint used the sand casting method of cash coin production, which at the time wasn't the standard yet.	Tang dynasty period	

=== 2009 ===
==== 2009 (Mainland China) ====
List of 2009 coin hoards in Mainland China
Date of discovery	Place of discovery	Image	Content	Long description of the find and notes	Date (if known)	Current location (if known)
11:30 AM on Tuesday June 9, 2009	A primary school located in Liquan County, Shaanxi		A cache of cash coins.	It was reported on June 12, 2009, by China Daily that about two tonnes (2.0 long tons; 2.2 short tons) of ancient Chinese cash coins were accidentally discovered on the grounds of a primary school located in Liquan County, Shaanxi. Zhao Aiguo, director of the Liquan County heritage and tourism bureau, stated that the coin hoard was accidentally discovered during the construction of the school's playground. The construction workers stumbled upon the coin hoard at around 11:30 AM on Tuesday June 9, 2009. The construction crew then proceeded to report the discovery of the cache to both the local heritage authority and the local police, after which the construction was halted to allow for the excavation. Following the arrival of local archaeologists and technicians the construction crew helped to collect the unearthed cash coins which were then placed in 170 bags, the bags were so numerous that they completely filled a lorry. The pit was constructed using blue bricks and the cash coins were kept in a 1.5 square metres (16 sq ft) pit which was about 1 metre (3 ft 3 in) high. The archaeologists noted that the site was a part of the now destroyed Xiangjici Temple constructed during the reign of the Western Han dynasty period Emperor Wen as a memorial for his late mother. Zhao Aiguo noted that there still is an extant tower, initially constructed in the year 834 during the Tang dynasty period, is located next to the primary school. Zhao Aiguo speculated that the cash coins were likely donated by people who visited the Xiangjici Temple and that the uncovered hole was an underground storage area for keeping the money. According to Zhao Aiguo the inscriptions on the cash coins date to the Tang, Song, and Mongol Yuan dynasties.	Yuan dynasty period	

== 2010s ==
=== 2010 ===
==== 2010 (Mainland China) ====
List of 2010 coin hoards in Mainland China
Date of discovery	Place of discovery	Image	Content	Long description of the find and notes	Date (if known)	Current location (if known)
November 27, 2010	Jiangyan, Jiangsu		432 Chinese cash coins.	On November 27, 2010, it was reported by the People's Daily Online a number of cash coins dating the Tang and Song dynasties including a rare silver coin with a hexagonal hole, were discovered at a construction site located in Jiangyan, Jiangsu. The site was immediately visited by archaeologist Chen Wei and Dou Yaping, the director of the Cultural Heritage Division of the Jiangyan Municipal Bureau of Culture, Radio, television, Press and Publication. On November 29 the team had found a total of 432 cash coins of which most were still in good condition, there were 56 different variants with a total of 25 different era names (or reign titles). The diameters of the unearthed coins range from 2.2 to 2.5 centimetres (0.87 to 0.98 in), and their thickness is between 0.5 and 1 millimetre (0.020 and 0.039 in). Most of them tend to have square holes with a side length of around 5 millimetres (0.20 in) in the centre. Of these cash coins, 21 were from the Tang dynasty period with the inscription Kaiyuan Tongbao (開元通寶, 621–846), while 411 were from the Song dynasty period with inscriptions such as Xiangfu Yuanbao (祥符元寶, 1008–1016) and Xining Yuanbao (熙寧元寶, 1068–1077). Furthermore, among these coins is a silver coin that has been slightly damaged with an illegible inscription and another cash coin with a hexagonal centre hole, Dou Yaping stated that cash coins with hexagonal centre holes are known as "Guijia Chuan", which is one subtype of the "Huachuan Kong" cash coins. The discovery of the silver coin is notable, as it was the first time that a silver coin from the Song dynasty period was found in Jiangyan.	Song dynasty period	_
December 10, 2010	Qianjiang, Zhejiang		500,000 to 600,000 ancient Chinese cash coins.	On December 10, 2010, a coin hoard consisting of between 500,000 and 600,000 ancient Chinese cash coins were discovered in a huge box underground at a construction site in the city of Qianjiang, Zhejiang according to a report by the People's Daily Online. The box containing the cash coins was discovered when a mechanical digger dug its claw into the earth and the box rose up from the ground. The coins that were found were attributed to different periods in Chinese history with earliest cash coin being cast in the year 175 B.C., while the most recent coin was cast in the year 1368 A.D. The cash coins were attributed to the Western Han dynasty period, the Tang dynasty period, the Five dynasties and Ten kingdoms period, the Song dynasty period, the Jurchen Jin dynasty period, the Mongol Yuan dynasty period, the Ming dynasty period, and a number of other dynasties.	Around 1368 AD	
Friday December 18, 2010	Ningqiang County, Shaanxi		A cash of Qing dynasty period cash coins.	It was reported on December 21, 2010, by the Xinhua News Agency that on Friday December 18, 2010, a large hoard of Manchu Qing dynasty period cash coins had been discovered in Ningqiang County, Shaanxi. The cash coins were found inside of a wooden case, that was 160 centimetres (63 in) in length, 80 centimetres (31 in) in width, and 30 centimetres (12 in) in height. The cash coins were all orderly ranked inside of the case in seven layers. According to the Cultural Relics and Tourism Department of Ningqiang County the cash coins together weighed 600 kilograms.	Qing dynasty period	_
Monday, December 20, 2010	Huaxian, Shaanxi		4 tonnes (3.9 long tons; 4.4 short tons) of Song dynasty period cash coins.	It was reported on Wednesday, December 22, 2010, that 4 tonnes (3.9 long tons; 4.4 short tons) of ancient Chinese cash coins dating to the Song dynasty had been discovered at a construction site in Hua County, Shaanxi. The construction crew discovered the cache on Monday, December 20, 20. The local authorities noted that all the cash coins were likely produced during the Song dynasty period and that the inscriptions on the cash coins indicated that they were cast between the years 1102 to 1106.	Song dynasty period	

=== 2011 ===
==== 2011 (Mainland China) ====
List of 2011 coin hoards in Mainland China
Date of discovery	Place of discovery	Image	Content	Long description of the find and notes	Date (if known)	Current location (if known)
2011	Shaanxi province		A silver Bai Jin San Pin (白金三品) coin with a horse pattern produced during the Han dynasty period.	In 2011 a silver Bai Jin San Pin (白金三品) coin with a horse pattern was discovered in the Shaanxi province. This was the second time that a silver Bai Jin San Pin was found and the second one with a horse pattern.	119–115 BC	
June 4, 2011	Suzhou, Jiangsu		200,000 Northern Song dynasty period cash coins.	On June 4, 2011, it was reported by the Xinhua News Agency that a large coin hoard had been uncovered in Suzhou, Jiangsu. The coin hoard consisted of approximately 200,000 Northern Song dynasty period cash coins. The cash coins were discovered by a construction crew building a road on Wednesday June 1, 2011, while opening up an old well. The construction workers quickly stopped there work quickly after they had realised that what they had stumbled across was different from what they would more usually encounter during their work. The opening to the well wasn't round but eight-sided and it was located approximately 4 to 5 meters below the surface. After the construction crew dug a bit deeper they found a large quantity of ancient Chinese cash coins located inside the well. The construction company immediately notified the Suzhou Archaeology Research Bureau, who sent a team of 8 archeologists to excavate the cash coin hoard. It took a full day of digging by the archaeologists to dig up all the coins. The dispatched team had been able to recover over eighty bags of cash coins, each weighing around 50 kg, weighing around 4 tonnes together. Mr. Zhang Tiejun (张铁军), the assistant to the president of the Suzhou Archaeology Research Bureau noted that the coin hoard was divided into two layers, where the top was organised while the bottom layer wasn't as much. Furthermore common jugs were found at the bottom of the well which indicated that it was a normal water well. The inscriptions of the cash coins located in the top layer were mostly Chongning Zhongbao (崇寧重寶) and were largely bigger coins, while the bottom layer consisted mostly of Yuanfeng Tongbao (元豐通寶) and Shaosheng Yuanbao (紹聖元寶) cash coins. Among the hoard was also a silver Shaosheng Yuanbao cash coin. Zhang Tiejun speculated that the cash coins were likely hidden in the well by a business man who was afraid of losing his wealth during a war. Because the hoard mostly consisted of bronze cash coins, Zhang Tiejun believed that the cash coins weren't hidden by a "rich and influential family", as they would usually own silver and gold reserves. Zhang Tiejun speculated that the cash coins were buried in a hurry for safekeeping during a Jurchen invasion of Suzhou when the city had turned into a war zone, as the coins were haphazardly placed together and the fact that the well served as an actual well before.	Jin–Song Wars	
June 15, 2011	Guangzhou, Guangdong		Over a thousand Xin dynasty period cash coins with the inscription Daquan Wushi (大泉五十).	On June 15, 2011, it was reported that the Guangzhou Cultural Relics Archaeological Research Institute had unearthed a pile of one thousand cash coins while excavating an Eastern Han dynasty period grave in Guangzhou, Guangdong. The discovered cash coins are all Xin dynasty period cash coins with the inscription Daquan Wushi (大泉五十). The Eastern Han dynasty grave is 8.2 meters in length and 5.02 meters in width. Other than the cash coins, the archeologists had also discovered nearly a hundred other objects inside of the grave including a bronze mirror, pottery, coloured tile, as well as different types of ornaments and jewelry made of jade and agate.	Eastern Han dynasty period	
July 6, 2011	Longhai Village, Fujian		A large number of Spanish dollars.	According to a report published on July 6, 2011, a large number of chop marked silver Spanish dollars were discovered buried inside of a dirt pile in Longhai Village, Fujian. The dirt pile came from the digging of a foundation for a new house by a Mr. Huang (黃), who had been dumped the dirt on the vacant lot four days prior to the discovery of the Spanish dollars by an unnamed villager, who noticed a shiny object. News of the discovery then proceeded to spread quickly, which set off a "digging frenzy" resulting in around a hundred villagers appearing at the site with hoes, shovels, and basins to look for more Spanish dollars in two piles of dirt, measuring about 20 square meters. Reportedly, several hundred silver Spanish dollars were unearthed, and when the police finally arrived most of the villagers had run the scene. According to a villager the oldest Spanish dollar found that morning was dated 1775 while the most recent coin being found was minted in 1802. It was noted by two experts with the Zhangzhou City Collections Society that the Spanish silver dollars came into the area because of foreign trade that had occurred there during the middle of the Qing dynasty period. Spanish silver dollars are frequently found in Longhai Village and residents gave them the nickname "funny face coins".	Mid-Qing dynasty period	
August 4, 2011	Cang County, Hebei		A string of iron cash coins.	It was reported on August 4, 2011, by the Xinhua News Agency that a string of iron cash coins dating to the Song dynasty had been found in Cang County, Hebei. The unearthed site in Cangxian was later found to have sat on the relics of what was likely a local government administration, because of this the archaeologists believe that the iron can coins were once stored by the government as a form of reserve money. According to Wang Minzhi, a local researcher, if the assumptions were proven to be true, this excavation and its findings would challenge the common consensus that the iron cash coins were exclusively produced and used in southern China at that time.	Song dynasty period	
August 24, 2011	Inner Mongolia		200 Tang and Song dynasty era cash coins.	It was reported on August 24, 2011, by the Xinhua News Agency that over 200 cash coins were unearthed in Inner Mongolia. The cash coins have inscriptions that were used during the Tang dynasty and Song dynasty periods and were covered with verdigris, with the majority of them being produced during the Northern Song dynasty. The coin hoard dated from a time when the area belonged to the Tangut Western Xia Empire. According to Zhang Zhenzhou of the Araxan Museum noted that the cash coins were probably buried there by desperate people during a war who wanted to hide their wealth from enemy soldiers.	Northern Song dynasty period	The Araxan Museum
Spring of 2010 (initial discovery); September 2011 (excavation)	Liaoyang, Liaoning		2,200 Later Jin dynasty period cash coins	It was reported on September 14, 2011, by Liaoning Daily (辽宁日报) that the police had arrested a gang of three men who were allegedly thieves that had unearthed around 2,200 cash coins from the Jurchen (or Manchu) Later Jin dynasty period in Liaoyang, Liaoning. The Bureau of Public Security of Liaoyang City stated that the gang was under the leadership of a name referred to as Mr. Wu, a 32-year-old who was a former taxi driver, was informed that some ancient Chinese cash coins had been discovered at a construction site during spring of 2010. For a year he would go to the construction site with a shovel and managed to unearth approximately 300 cash coins. In May 2011 Mr. Wu had purchased a metal detector and he rented a large excavator to find more cash coins. Afterwards Mr. Wu had recruited a "treasure digging team", together they had been able to discover over 2,200 Later Jin dynasty period cash coins weighing 17 kilograms (37.4 pounds). After the find, Mr. Wu sold the coins for $101,700 (or 650,000 yuan). Later the person who had purchased these cash coins was arrested and told the police from whom he had acquired the coins. All of the Later Jin cash coins found at the site had inscriptions that were written in Manchu script. According to some local cultural relics experts these cash coins were a special issue that weren't meant to be circulated as money. It has been speculated by these experts that these cash coins were issued under Nurhachi to be awarded to military generals for their meritorious achievements. As these cash coins are extremely rare, it is speculated that the market value of this coin hoard would be $470,000 (¥3,000,000) at a minimum.	Later Jin dynasty period (1616–1636)	
October 2011	Cangzhou, Hebei		Several tonnes of iron cash coins.	In October 2011 it was reported that another pile of iron cash coins was unearthed in Cangzhou, Hebei. Based on preliminary calculations, the pile of iron cash coins fill an area that is about 25 m by 16 m. The top of the iron can coin pile is about 0.4 to 0.5 meters below the surface level. At the time of the initial discovery experts estimated that there were several tons of iron cash coins in the discovered pile. According to Mr. Yang Fengling (杨凤岭), the Director of the Cang Prefecture Cultural Relics Institute, it is not yet known if there is any connection between the newly discovered pile of iron cash coins and those that were discovered nearby in 1997.	Song dynasty period	
October 27, 2011	Suqian, Jiangsu		A silver dollar (yuan) depicting Yuan Shikai.	In an October 27, 2011, news report, the Suqian Evening News (宿迁晚报) noted that a silver coin bearing the image of Yuan Shikai had been discovered by Chinese archeologists inside of a coffin in Suqian, Jiangsu. The archeologists were excavating tombs in an area where most of the tombs date back to the Han dynasty period, but the fact that this tomb contains a 20th-century silver coin is evidence that the tomb where it was discovered (No. 4 Tomb) is a more recent one. While the casket did it include the coin, it did not include any corpse. The archeologists working at the site speculated that the "No. 4 Tomb" might have been a cenotaph (traditional Chinese: 衣冠塚; simplified Chinese: 衣冠冢; pinyin: yī guān zhǒng). A village elder alternatively speculated that the tomb may have been empty because of a local Suqian custom where the relatives of the deceased would have exhumed the corpse to have it reburied somewhere else.	Between 1912 and 1949	
October 27, 2011	Rufu Stone Pagoda (儒符石塔), Haikou, Hainan		70 Taiping Tongbao (太平通寶) cash coins.	In a report by the Haikou Evening News (海口晚报) published on October 27, 2011, it was revealed that Chinese archaeologists had uncovered a number of Northern Song dynasty period cash coins while working at a restoration of the Rufu Stone Pagoda (儒符石塔) built from volcanic rock near Haikou, Hainan. Up until that point it was difficult to determine when the Rufu Stone Pagoda had been built as the oldest historical records that mention the building date back to the Ming dynasty, but it was suspected prior to this discovery that the Rufu Stone Pagoda may have been constructed sometime during the late Song Dynasty, but there was no evidence that supported this hypothesis. During the renovation a worker had found a stone tortoise-shaped box, inside of this box were over 70 bronze Northern Song dynasty period Taiping Tongbao (太平通寶) cash coins which were produced from 976 until 989. Mr. Wang Daxin (王大新), the Director of the Haikou City Bureau of Cultural Relics (海口市文物局), noted that the thread that was used to bind the cash coins together had still been partially preserved. Furthermore, inside of this tortoise-shaped box were six silver tablets (which were originally thought to have been made from tin), of these six tablets, one had the Chinese inscription Fude Changshou (Chinese: 福德長壽; pinyin: fú dé cháng shòu, "good fortune, virtue, and to live a long life"), the second tablet has the inscription Qian Yuan Heng Li Zhen (Chinese: 乾元亨利貞; pinyin: qián yuán hēng lì zhēn, a cryptic phrase from the I-Ching), and A third tablet has the inscription Wanggang Dasheng (Chinese: 王剛大聖; pinyin: wáng gāng dà shèng). Three of the discovered silver tablets were too fragile to undergo cleaning and their inscriptions can't be read. The discovery of the Taiping Tongbao cash coins were an important find as it might suggest that the Rufu Stone Pagoda was constructed during this period.	Between 976 and 989	
November 10, 2011	The Golden Horse River, Wenjiang District, Chengdu, Sichuan		A large number of Chinese cash coins.	It was reported on November 10, 2011, by the Sichuan News Network (四川新闻网) that a large number of local residents of the Wenjiang District, Chengdu, Sichuan were recovering cash coins from the Golden Horse River (traditional Chinese: 金馬河; simplified Chinese: 金马河; pinyin: jīn mǎ hé). The Golden Horse River hoard is considered particularly unusual among Chinese coin hoards, because the bronze Chinese cash coins that were unearthed came from many different periods and dynasties in Chinese history spanning over two millennia. The local residents arrived with shovels, hoes, sickles, and any other equipment used for digging to search for more coins. Some of the local residents managed to dig up several kilograms of cash coins while other locals were only able to find ten or twenty cash coins. Soon the local police was alerted by the local authorities and they tried to cordon off the area to let the local Bureau of Cultural Relics dispatch archeologists to retrieve the cash coins. The treasure hunting done by the local residents was seen as "looting" because in accordance to the law of the People's Republic of China all cultural relics that are buried on land or discovered somewhere in the territorial waters or seas of China are at all times to be considered state property, and the local residents were asked by the police to "return" their findings. After the Chengdu archaeologists had arrived on the scene they had determined that the cash coins from the Golden Horse River board were strewn over an area approximately two hundred meters long and one hundred meters wide. Within only a short period of time the Chengdu archaeologists had managed to find over 5 kilograms of cash coins. The local archeologists stated that it was not practical to try to excavate the site or even attempt to preserve it because that there was a possibility of dangerous flood waters suddenly appearing. A few local archaeologists speculated as to why the cash coins were found there spun over such a large period of time, Mr. Liu Yumao (刘雨茂) noted that it was customary throughout Chinese history to place old cash coins into structures that were built for things such as irrigation and water conservancy, this superstition was done in the hopes of gaining good fortune and to avoid disaster. Liu Yumao further stated that the cash coins from the Golden Horse River hoard may have originally been buried inside of such a structure, and that later over time this structure had eroded and was washed. After this the cash coins could then have been carried across the river by the current and eventually ended at the site where they were found. As to why most of the unearthed cash coins came from the Tang dynasty period, local archeologist Mr. Wang Zongxiong (王仲雄) noted that it was possible that during this period a boat which was carrying coins across the Golden Horse River may have sunk and that the cash coins in its cargo were hidden underwater until they were found in 2011. While most cash coins found at the Golden Horse River hoard are Tang dynasty period Kaiyuan Tongbao (開元通寶) and Qianyuan Zhongbao (乾元重寶), while other inscriptions of cash coins found at the Golden Horse River hoard range from Han dynasty period Wu Zhu (五銖), Xin dynasty Huo Quan (貨泉) to Manchu Qing dynasty period Qianlong Tongbao (乾隆通寶) as well as Guangxu coinage (光緒錢).	Various periods	

==== 2011 (Hong Kong) ====
List of 2011 coin hoards in Hong Kong
Date of discovery	Place of discovery	Image	Content	Long description of the find and notes	Date (if known)	Current location (if known)
2011	San Tau, Lantau Island, Hong Kong		Kaiyuan Tongbao cash coins	During excavations of graves conducted on San Tau on Lantau Island in Hong Kong a number of coins were unearthed. Excluding a single Hong Kong ten-cent coin with a diameter of 2/05 centimeters, a thickness of 0.20 centimeters, and a weight of 5 grams issued in 1961, all coins found during the excavation were Tang dynasty period Kaiyuan Tongbao (開元通寳, 621–907) cash coins. Most of the unearthed Kaiyuan Tongbao cash coins were stacked which suggests that they were either strung together or kept in either a small bag or a pouch. The found cash coins were cast in different styles, sizes, thicknesses, and weights. All Tang cash coins had their inscriptions written in regular script. The smallest of the Tang coins were 2.40 centimeters in diameter while the largest were 2.60 centimeters. The grave with the most coins was identified as Grave G4.	Tang dynasty period	

=== 2012 ===
==== 2012 (Mainland China) ====
List of 2012 coin hoards in Mainland China
Date of discovery	Place of discovery	Image	Content	Long description of the find and notes	Date (if known)	Current location (if known)
2012	Tongxin County, Ningxia Hui Autonomous Region		A cache of Western Xia cash coins.	In the year 2012 a farmer digging in a field in Tongxin County, Ningxia Hui Autonomous Region had uncovered a cache of Western Xia cash coins. This discovery is notable for including a Qianyou Yuanbao (乾佑元寶) cash coin issued during the reign of Emperor Renzong written in seal script. This is the known instance of a Qianyou Yuanbao cash coin with an inscription written in seal script. The seal script Qianyou Yuanbao cash coin has a diameter of 25.4 millimeters, a thickness of 1.5 millimeters, and weighs of 3.3 grams.	Western Xia dynasty period	
2012	Hebei		98 specimens of knife money and 161 specimens of spade money.	In the year 2012 a Chinese villager in the province of Hebei digging a well in his yard had unearthed a large cache of knife and spade money which was dated to the Warring States period. The hoard included 98 specimens of knife money and 161 specimens of spade money. This was the first major hoard of ancient Chinese coinage from this era that had been unearthed in Laiyuan County, Hebei. Both the spade and knife money from this hoard were attributed to Yan. The hoard includes both "square foot" spades (方足布) and "pointed foot" spades (尖足布).	Warring States period	
January 5, 2012	Longwan Zhen (龙湾镇), Qianjiang, Hubei		Cash coins from the Han, Tang, and Song dynasties and a bronze mirror with a cash coin design	It was reported on January 5, 2012, that cash coins and a bronze mirror incorporating a cash coin design were discovered during the excavation of a Song dynasty period tomb in Longwan Zhen (龙湾镇), Qianjiang, Hubei. The Qianjiang Cultural Relics Bureau (潜江文物局) stated that archaeologists had uncovered a Song dynasty bronze mirror which incorporated cash coin motifs, 3 silver bracelets, a bronze wash basin, and 42 cash coins. The cash coins were issued during different reign periods by over ten emperors, which was a first for any single tomb located in Qianjiang. According to the Qianjiang Cultural Relics Bureau the discovery of this tomb will contribute greatly to the understanding of how local past burial customs were observed during the time and it would also contribute to the understanding of the historical changes that had occurred in the region during the Song dynasty period. The inscriptions on the discovered cash coins include Han dynasty period Wu Zhu (五銖), Tang dynasty period Kaiyuan Tongbao (開元通寳), and Song dynasty period Taiping Taobao (太平通寶, 976–989), Jingde Yuanbao (景德元寶, 998–1022), and Xining Tongbao (熙寧通寶, 1068–1085).	Song dynasty period	
July 16, 2012	Kuqa, Xinjiang		Han dynasty era Wu Zhu (五銖) and "Chiseled rim Wu Zhu" (鑿邊五銖) cash coins, Xin dynasty era Huo Quan (貨泉) and Daquan Wushi (大泉五十) cash coins, a Three Kingdoms period Taiping Baiqian (太平百錢) cash coins, as well as native cash coins.	On July 16, 2012, a large cache of 14,000 ancient Chinese coins was found in Kuqa, Xinjiang which included Han dynasty era Wu Zhu (五銖) and "Chiseled rim Wu Zhu" (鑿邊五銖) cash coins, Xin dynasty era Huo Quan (貨泉) and Daquan Wushi (大泉五十) cash coins, a Three Kingdoms period Taiping Baiqian (太平百錢) cash coins, as well as native cash coins. Alongside the cash coins were shards of pottery as well as fragments of human bones which lead the archeologists believe that this was an old cemetery.	Kucha Kingdom period	
August 2012	Huoluochaideng, Ordos City Inner Mongolia		3,500 kg of Wu Zhu and Xin dynasty era cash coins.	In August 2012 a large hoard of Wu Zhu cash coins and Xin dynasty era cash coins was found in the city of Huoluochaideng, Ordos City Inner Mongolia. The hoard included 3500 kg of Chinese cash coins and around 150 clay moulds used to manufacture coins from the Xin dynasty. According to archeologists the site might've been a mint that was in operation since the reign of Emperor Wu until Emperor Wang Mang.	Han dynasty period	
August 18, 2012	Zaozhuang, Shandong		The smallest Chinese cash coins ever found.	It was reported on August 18, 2012, by China Central Television on an unusual coin hoard in Zaozhuang, Shandong. The hoard is unusual because the discovered coin may be the smallest Chinese cash coin that has ever been found. The China Central Television report stated that the cash coin was "paper-thin with a rough edge and no larger than a fingernail". While the cash coin has no inscription, it is believed to be a privately produced cash coin from the Southern and Northern dynasties period. The reporters noted that these diminutive cash coins were produced by people whom they described as "money-mad governors and greedy landlords" with the reason given by China Central Television being "to squeeze poor peasants" Furthermore, the report noted that during the Southern and Northern dynasties period 10,000 of these cash coins would not have been sufficient to purchase a single bowl of rice.	Southern and Northern dynasties period	
Early October 2012	Wangminxiang Hongtaicun Village (王民乡红太村), Xiji County, Ningxia Hui Autonomous Region		17 Kushan coins	In early October 2012, a villager digging near an old wall had unearthed 17 ancient Silk Road coins in Wangminxiang Hongtaicun Village (王民乡红太村), Xiji County, Ningxia Hui Autonomous Region. According to Mr. Su Zhengxi (苏正喜) of the Xiji Prefecture Coin Museum (西吉县钱币博物馆) these are coins issued by the Kushan Empire. The coins are about 1.2 to 1.5 centimeters in diameter, they have a thickness of 0.25 centimeters, and they tend to have a weight between 2.4 and 3.7 grams. The description of the Kushan coins from this hoard are described differently by different newspaper reports. According to some articles the discovered Kushan coins bear the image of a king on one side and the image of either a cow or an ox on their reverse sides. An article from another newspaper report state that there are written letters on one side of the cooks and an image of a cow or oxen on the other side. Su Zhengxi mentions that three of the discovered bronze Kushan coins have inscriptions that are written in a "foreign (non-Chinese) script". Another newspaper article mentions that the Kushan coins were minted (struck) in the same manner as ancient Greek coins were and that the obverse sides of the coins have legends that are written in a form of "Kushanised" Greek letters. This article mentions that the reverse sides of the unearthed coins in Xiji County are said to have images of ancient Persian and Indian deities. This coin hoard is notably the first one in Ningxia that contains Kushan coinage, and this was the largest hoard of such coins that up until this point have ever been discovered in Ningxia, and for the first time Silk Road coins have been unearthed that were not mixed with any other types of coins. Previous to this coin hoard in Xiji County, the only Kushan coinages of this type that have been unearthed anywhere in China have included around "several tens of coins" that were discovered in the Loulan ruins (楼兰遗址) and Hotan County, Xinjiang. While historical records do mention that the area where these coins were discovered in formed a part of the Silk Road, there had been no prior archaeological evidence to confirm these claims, but this coin hoard is the archeological evidence that was needed to verify these claims.	Mid-Yuan dynasty period	The Xiji Prefecture Coin Museum
November to December 2012	The Yujiabu cemetery in Zhangqiu, Jinan Shandong		Wu Zhu and Daquan Wushi cash coins	During excavations conducted from November to December in 2012 in the Yujiabu cemetery in Zhangqiu, Jinan Shandong, the Jinan Municipal Archaeological Institute had discovered a number of cash coins in the tombs. The excavation had discovered a total of seventeen tombs, including earth shaft tombs from the Han dynasty period, earth shaft tombs with a brick-built outer coffin from the Han dynasty period, brick-chamber tombs from the Han dynasty period, and an earth pit tomb with cave chamber from the Qing dynasty period. The 6 earth shafts mostly yielded Wu Zhu cash coins, while the tombs identified as "Tomb M3" and "Tomb M8" contained Xin dynasty period Daquan Wushi (大泉五十) cash coins, indicating that the people buried there were likely done so during the Xin dynasty period rather than the Han dynasty era.	Han and Xin dynasty periods	

=== 2013 ===
==== 2013 (Mainland China) ====
List of 2013 coin hoards in Mainland China
Date of discovery	Place of discovery	Image	Content	Long description of the find and notes	Date (if known)	Current location (if known)
2013	The tomb of Emperor Jiemin of Northern Wei in Luoyang, Henan		A gold solidus issued during the reign of Emperor Anastasius I Dicorus	In the year 2013 a gold Eastern Roman coin had been discovered inside of a tomb preliminarily concluded to be that of Emperor Jiemin of Northern Wei in Luoyang, Henan. The gold coin is a solidus issued during the reign of Emperor Anastasius I Dicorus and has a diameter of between 2.1 and 2.2 centimeters. According to the archaeologists at the site, the discovery of this solidus inside of an imperial Chinese tomb provides further evidence that the city of Luoyang was the eastern terminus of the Silk Road.	Northern and Southern dynasties dynasty	
2013	Weihe River, Xi'an city, Shaanxi province		A silver turtle-shaped Bai Jin San Pin (白金三品) coin produced during the Han dynasty period.	In 2013, while sand dredgers were excavating in the dried up bed of the Weihe River (渭河) in the northern suburbs of the city of Xi'an they discovered turtle-shaped silver Bai Jin San Pin (白金三品) coin. The coin is 1.6 inches (40 millimeters) in length, 0.8 inch (21 millimeters) in width, and has a thickness of 0.12 inch (3.1 millimeters). The coin weighs 10 grams. The obverse side of this silver coin is dome-shaped with its middle being thick and its edges thin, it has a scaly armour design indicating that it is the design of a turtle Bai Jin San Pin coin as is mentioned in the Records of the Grand Historian (《史记·平淮书》). This coin contains a small square seal located at its centre right. This counterstamp is believed to be the Chinese seal script character shao (少), referring to the shaofu (少府). (Note: Both the Records of the Grand Historian and the Book of Han mention that the agency responsible for the production of the Bai Jin San Pin (白金三品) coins was the Shaofu (少府). Various English translations of Shaofu exist, these include "Privy Treasurer", "Minister Steward", "Chamberlain of the Palace Revenues", and "Superintendent of the Lesser Treasury" (further reading: "Translation of Han dynasty titles"). The Shaofu was the government agency that oversaw the management of the palace treasury, i.e., the private finances of the Han dynasty'd imperial clan.) The reverse side of this turtle-shaped Bai Jin San Pin coin is flat. Its reverse inscription consists of 2 vertically written seal script characters. According to Mr. Huang Xiquan (黄锡全), a notable and recognised numismatic expert and the former head of the China Numismatic Museum, these two seal script characters are read as chui guang (垂光). Huang Xiquan noted that meaning of chui guang in this context refers to the achievements of the Han dynasty Emperor Wu and stands for "glory illuminates, bounties bestowed to the world" (光辉普照，恩泽人间之意). The turtle is also an ancient Chinese symbol used to illustrate the concepts of "longevity" and "immortality".	119–115 BC	
January 25, 2013	The Fuhaiyuan Temple (福海院) in Anxi County, Quanzhou, Fujian		27.5 kilograms of Kaiyuan Tongbao cash coins.	It was reported on January 25, 2013, that during a renovation of one of the rear halls of the Fuhaiyuan Temple (福海院) in Anxi County, Quanzhou, Fujian, a buried jar containing 27.5 kilograms of ancient Chinese cash coins was discovered. All of these cash coins date to the Tang dynasty period and have the inscription Kaiyuan Tongbao (開元通寶). Construction on the temple began in the year 900 and it remains unknown why the cash coins were buried there. A local official named Ms. Lin Meilian (林美莲) speculated that, despite the Fuhaiyuan Temple being the largest temple in the area during the Tang period, the cash coins might have been buried at the temple as a "rainy day fund".	Around 900	
February 20, 2013	Chenzhou, Anren County, Hunan		7.5 kg of Tang, Song, and Mongol Yuan dynasty cash coins.	On February 20, 2013, workers digging at a construction site had unearthed a "money pit" that dated back some seven centuries in the city of Chenzhou, Anren County, Hunan. The "money pit" contained approximately 7.5 kg of cash coins dating from the late Southern Song dynasty period until the early Mongol Yuan dynasty period, with a few cash coins dating as far back as the Tang dynasty. The report on the find was covered by Mr. Cai Ning (蔡宁) of the Anren Prefecture Cultural Relics Administrative Office (安仁县文物管理所) and Mr. Duan Bangqiong (段邦琼) of the Anren Prefecture Bureau of Culture, Broadcasting and the Press (安仁县文广新局). Over 20 different inscriptions of Southern Song dynasty cash coins had been recovered at the site. The reported cash coin inscriptions from the hoard include (among others) the Tang dynasty period Kaiyuan Tongbao (開元通寶), Song dynasty period Chongning Tongbao (崇寧通寶), Chongning Zhongbao (崇寧重寶), Zhenghe Tongbao (政和通寶), Huangsong Tongbao (皇宋通寶), and Xianping Zhongbao (咸平重寶), and the Mongol Yuan dynasty period Dade Tongbao (大德通寶). Furthermore, the inscriptions mentioned by the news articles include Jingyuan Tongbao (景元通寶, Cảnh Nguyên Thông Bảo), which is sometimes attributed to Vietnam, but the cash coins true origins remain unknown, and Chunhua Tongbao (淳化通寶). What's notable about this find is that no historical sources or major Chinese coin catalogues ever mentioned either the Chunhua Tongbao (淳化通寶) cash coins or the Xianping Zhongbao (咸平重寶) cash coins, as these might have been cast during the same periods as the Chunhua Yuanbao (淳化元寶) cash coins and the Xianping Yuanbao (咸平元寶) cash coins, respectively. While no other Chunhua Tongbao cash coin has ever been known to exist prior to this find, another Xianping Zhongbao was unearthed in 2010 in Shaanxi. If the reports on these cash coins turn out to be true then this Anren County coin hoard would be considered a significant find in Chinese numismatics.	Early Yuan dynasty period	
March 2013	Longshan Village (龙山村) near Xuzhou, Jiangsu		"Several tens" of Song dynasty period cash coins	In an article published by the Pengcheng Daily (彭城晚报) newspaper in their May 6, 2013, edition it was reported that in March 2013 archaeologists were excavating a brick Ming dynasty period tomb they had found Song dynasty cash coins in Longshan Village (龙山村) near Xuzhou, Jiangsu. During the excavation the archeologists were tasked with moving the entire tomb to the Suining County Museum (睢宁县博物馆). Usually tombs can be fairly easily attributed to a time period because of the coinages found inside of them but this is not the case for this tomb as no Ming dynasty period cash coins were found inside of it. The tomb is attributed to the year 1595 during the Ming dynasty period because it contains the inscription "Wanli Er Shi San Nian Si Yue Wang Ri" (萬曆二十三年四月望日, "15th day of the 4th (lunar) month of the 23rd year of Wanli Emperor") written above the door of the coffin chamber, the tomb contains two skulls which the archeologists believed belonged to a married couple. The wooden caskets where they would have lied inside of have completely decayed and only some coffin nails remain. Inside of this old tomb the only coins that were found were exclusively Song dynasty cash coins, during the excavation of the tomb "several tens" of Chinese cash coins had been discovered by the archeologists on the floor located on the left side of the chamber that housed the coffins. According to the Pengcheng Daily the room had been "disturbed" in the past, which means that it is unclear if the cash coins were found in the original location as according to burial customs of the time, the Song cash coins were in all likelihood placed either underneath the corpses or somewhere inside of the wooden casket. The Chinese archaeologists stated that "unless the deceased were Buddhists or coin collectors", the answer as to why only Song dynasty period cash coins were located inside of the tom must probably have to do with another contemporary Chinese burial custom. The archeologists speculate that the custom might be a Ming dynasty version of the "five emperor coins" used today with Qing dynasty cash coins. The cash coins found were produced during the reign of Emperor Shenzong and have the inscriptions Xining Zhongbao (熙寧重寶) and Yuanfeng Tongbao (元豐通寶). These legends can be viewed as auspicious inscriptions as the "Xining" (熙寧, "peaceful prosperity") and "Yuanfeng" (元豐, "primary abundance") period titles, or era names, both have auspicious meanings.	1595	
May 3, 2013	Guangxingdian Village (广兴店村), Pingquan, Hebei		600 Ming knives	It was reported on May 3, 2013, that Mr. Liu Jiafu (刘佳富), a villager from Pingquan, Hebei, had discovered a buried clay pot containing about 600 specimen knife money in Guangxingdian Village (广兴店村). According to Mr. Chang Wen (常文) from the Cultural Relics Protection Bureau of Pingquan County (平泉县问保所) all of the knife money found were "Ming knives" issued by Yan.	Warring States period	
May 18, 2013	Guzhen County, Anhui		500 pounds of cash coins rom the Tang and Northern Song dynasties	In a news report broadcast by the Anhui TV Station (安徽卫视) on May 18, 2013, it was reported that Chinese archaeologists from the Guzhen County Bureau of Cultural Relics (固镇县文物局) dug up 500 pounds of cash coins in Guzhen County, Anhui. The cash coins were discovered stacked together in a very orderly manner. The Chinese archaeologists speculate that most of the cash coins they found would have been threaded together on strings and that they were then neatly arranged. However, by the time of the excavation the strings that held the cash coins together have long since rotted away and many of the unearthed cash coins were corroded together. The unearthed coins include Kaiyuan Tongbao (開元通寶) cash coins from the Tang dynasty period, as well as Yuanfeng Tongbao (元豐通寶), Yuanyou Tongbao (元祐通寶), Chongning Tongbao (崇寧通寶) cash coins among others from the Northern Song dynasty period. The archeologists of the Guzhen County Bureau of Cultural Relics suspect that the cash coins probably belonged to a rich family during the Northern Song dynasty period that wanted to hide the money from robbers or during a time of unrest.	Northern Song dynasty period	
May 22, 2013	Dingxi, Gansu		114 kilograms of Chinese cash coins from various dynasties.	On May 23, 2013, it was reported in an issue of the Lanzhou Morning News (兰州晨报) that cash coins from the Han, Tang, Song, and Jurchen Jin dynasties had been unearthed at a construction site in Dingxi, Gansu on May 22, 2013. According to eyewitness reports the coin hoard occupied an area of two meters square and was about eighty centimeters in depth. The coin cache was buried about two meters below the surface level. Soon after the discovery archaeologists from the Dingxi City Museum (定西市安定区博物馆) were sent to the construction site where they would recover 114 kilograms (or 251 pounds) of ancient Chinese bronze cash coins. Most of the unearthed cash coins date to the Song dynasty period. According to the archaeologists from the Dingxi City Museum, this coin hoard was the largest cache of ancient Chinese bronze cash coins ever discovered in Dingxi City at the time. Inscriptions of the cash coins include Han dynasty period Wu Zhu (五銖), Tang dynasty period Kaiyuan Tongbao (開元通寶) and Qianyuan Zhongbao (乾元重寶), Northern Song dynasty period Xiangfu Tongbao (祥符通寶), Tiansheng Yuanbao (天聖元寶), Mingdao Yuanbao (明道元寶), Huangsong Tongbao (皇宋通寶), Zhiping Yuanbao (治平元寶), Xining Zhongbao (熙寧重寶), Yuanfeng Tongbao (元豐通寶), Yuanyou Tongbao (元祐通寶), Shaosheng Yuanbao (紹聖元寶), Yuanfu Tongbao (元符通寶), Shengsong Yuanbao (聖宋元寶), Chongning Zhongbao (崇寧重寶), Daguan Tongbao (大觀通寶), Xuanhe Tongbao (宣和通寶), Southern Song dynasty period Shaoxing Yuanbao (紹興元寶), and some unspecified Jurchen Jin dynasty cash coins.	Song dynasty period	Dingxi City Museum
April 23, 2013	A construction site in Kuqa County, Xinjiang		Around 3,000 Kaiyuan Tongbao cash coins	In an April 25, 2013, article by the China News Service it was reported that the Kucha Bureau of Cultural Relics (库车县文物局) was informed of the discovery of a large number of Tang dynasty period Kaiyuan Tongbao (開元通寶) cash coins at a construction site in Kuqa County, Xinjiang on April 23, 2013. By April 24 a team of archeologists had uncovered around 3000 Kaiyuan Tongbao cash coins, by this time the construction site was being managed by staff of the Kucha Bureau of Cultural Relics and the Qiuci Bureau of Public Security (龟兹公安分局) and more cash coins were continuing to be unearthed at the site. According to Ms. Yin Qiuling (尹秋玲), a cadre with the Kucha Bureau of Cultural Relics, the Kaiyuan Tongbao cash coins had been buried at the site for more than a millennium, and while the cash coins had acquired a patina, their legends could still be quite clearly read. The Kaiyuan Tongbao cash coins at the site were found scattered in an area that was about 10 meters long by 5 meters wide. It was later reported on May 2, 2013, that the number of unearthed Kaiyuan Tongbao cash coins at the site had almost reached 10,000.	Tang dynasty period	
Early August 2013	Renhezhai Village, Xiping County, Zhumadian, Henan		An undocumented number of Northern Song dynasty period cash coins.	It was reported by Dahe Daily on September 16, 2013, that a coin excavation has been conducted by local villagers in Renhezhai Village, Xiping County, Zhumadian, Henan. While workers were digging a ditch in early August 2013 some young children playing at the site had found some cash coins in the ditch, which inspired adults from near and far to start digging to look for more, who reported found "many had found lots of ancient coins", while other people went to the scene to purchase the coins. A local resident named Ms. Li (李姓) noted that the coins sold for 380 yuan ($60) per kilogram. Local villagers were confused as to why after a month no local officials in charge of cultural relics had attempted to intervene as is customary in China, Dahe Daily reported that the more soil is dug at the site in Renhezhai Village the process of searching for ancient Chinese cash coins, the mud might collapse which may cause lethal accidents. Of the coins that were excavated at the site, most dated back to the Northern Song dynasty period.	Northern Song dynasty period	

=== 2014 ===
==== 2014 (Taiwan) ====
List of 2014 coin hoards in the free area of the Republic of China
Date of discovery	Place of discovery	Image	Content	Long description of the find and notes	Date (if known)	Current location (if known)
Late July 2014	Chiayi Botanical Garden, East District, Chiayi, Taiwan province		2 silver Spanish coins from the 17th to 19th centuries (among other items).	During a dig commissioned by the local government of Chiayi in conjunction with Taipei City-based Taiwan Taritsi Cultural Association at the Chiayi Botanical Garden a number of old artifacts were discovered including pottery and bracelets from Taiwan, china, clay, and glass dating to the Qing dynasty period and the Japanese colonial period, as well as 2 silver coins made by the Spanish. Project leader Yen Ting-yu stated about the findings that "It indicates that only a few households lived in pile dwellings by the river in prehistoric times, and Chinese merchants probably brought the Spanish coins to Taiwan." The Chiayi Cultural Affairs Bureau noted that in order for the cultural assets to be preserved that the site should officially be designated as a cultural heritage site.		

=== 2015 ===
==== 2015 (Mainland China) ====
List of 2015 coin hoards in Mainland China
Date of discovery	Place of discovery	Image	Content	Long description of the find and notes	Date (if known)	Current location (if known)
2015	The tomb of the Marquis of Haihun in Xinjian, Nanchang, Jiangxi		Around 2,000,000 Wu Zhu cash coins weighing 10 tonnes	In 2015 Chinese archeologists uncovered 10 tonnes of bronze Wu Zhu cash coins from the Western Han dynasty (or around 2 million cash coins) alongside over ten thousand of other iron, bronze, and gold items in the Haihunhou cemetery near Nanchang, Jiangxi, among the other uncovered items were bamboo slips, wood tablets, as well as jade objects. As these Wu Zhu cash coins were strung in strings of 1000 pieces this proved that the practice of stringing cash coins per 1000 didn't first happen during the Tang dynasty as was previously thought but actually six hundred years earlier. By 2017 the cash coins unearthed at the site had numbered to around 2,000,000 Wu Zhu cash coins, on January 9, 2017, iFeng.com reported that a rare Wu Zhu cash coin with a character that was found to have been carved upside down.	Western Han dynasty period	
January 26, 2015	Xinjiang County, Shanxi		Over 12,000 Northern Song dynasty period iron cash coins	On January 26, 2015, the Shanxi News Network (山西新闻网) reported that over 12,000 iron cash coins produced during the Northern Song dynasty had been recovered at an archaeological site, situated on a high precipice, in the historical prefecture of Jiangzhou, located in Xinjiang County, Shanxi. The iron cash coins were unearthed during a 20-month excavation by the Shanxi Provincial Institute of Archaeology (山西省考古研究所). While the unearthed iron cash coins were severely corroded, after the archeologists had treating them for rust, it was revealed that the iron cash coins originated during six reign periods in the mid and late Northern Song dynasty period. The inscriptions of the iron cash coins were Xining Tongbao (熙寧通寶), Yuanyou Tongbao (元祐通寶), Shaosheng Yuanbao (紹聖元寶), Chongning Tongbao (崇寧通寶), Daguan Tongbao (大觀通寶), and Zhenghe Tongbao (政和通寶). The most commonly found inscription in the hoard was Zhenghe Tongbao. Other than the iron cash coins, the archeologists had further unearthed several furnaces (爐灶, lú zào) and crucibles (坩堝, gān guō). It remains currently unknown whether or not the furnaces and crucibles are somehow related to the over 12,000 iron cash coins that were uncovered.	Northern Song dynasty period	
Approx. 10:00 AM March 21, 2015	Longgang Town, Yancheng, Jiangsu		Tang and Song dynasty period cash coins	At approximately 10:00 AM on March 21, 2015, the excavator was dredging a small 6-meter wide river that runs through Longgang Town, Yancheng, Jiangsu had uncovered a pile of ancient Chinese cash coins dating to the Tang and Song dynasties that had been stored inside of a earthenware pot. After the word of the coin hoard had spread throughout the village, a number of local residents started to "treasure hunt" in the area looking for more old cash coins. The villagers had found around 200–300 catties (267–400 pounds, 121–181 kilograms) of cash coins before they were chased away by the police because it's illegal in the People's Republic of China to take "cultural relics" as they're all legally government property. Zhao Yongzheng (赵永正) of the Archaeology Department of the Yancheng Museum (盐城市博物馆考古部) noted that this coin cache was probably buried there somewhere at the beginning of the Southern Song dynasty period. The inscriptions of the unearthed cash coins included the Tang dynasty period Kaiyuan Tongbao (開元通寶), as well as the Song dynasty period Taiping Tongbao (太平通寶), Tiansheng Yuanbao (天聖元寶), Xiangfu Yuanbao (祥符元寶), Zhenghe Tongbao (政和通寶).	Southern Song dynasty period	
May 11, 2015	Mengyuan Village (孟塬乡) Pengyang County, Guyuan, Ningxia Hui Autonomous Region		A Western Xia period Da An Bao Qian (大安寶錢, 𘜶𗵐𘏨𘔭) cash coin and a Northern Song dynasty Chunhua Yuanbao (淳化元寶) cash coin.	According to an article published on May 11, 2015, two cash coins were uncovered in Mengyuan Village (孟塬乡) Pengyang County, Guyuan, Ningxia Hui Autonomous Region. The two cash coins were obtained by the Pengyang County Office of Chronicles Compilation (彭阳县史志办公室) from a local coin collector named Mr. Hu (虎). The first cash coin is a Western Xia period Da An Bao Qian (大安寶錢, 𘜶𗵐𘏨𘔭) cash coin with a diameter of 2.4 centimeters. Its inscription is notably written in a "slanted character" variety (斜字版, Xié zì bǎn) of Tangut script and it has a blank reverse. The second cash coin is a Chunhua Yuanbao (淳化元寶) cash coin produced during the Northern Song dynasty period. It is notably a rare version of the regular script (or "royally inscribed") variety of the coin, as the "氵" radical of the Chinese character "淳" is a "shortened" variant which does not extend all the way to the bottom of the character, as the more "common" variants of the Northern Song dynasty's Chunhua Yuanbao cash coins tend to have. Because of the way the radical looks, this type of Chunhua Tongbao is known to Chinese numismatists as the "shortened shui" or "shrunken shui" variety (縮水版, Suōshuǐ bǎn) and only a handful of authentic specimens of the "shortened shui" Chunhua Tongbao cash coins are known to exist. According to Qi Yuezhang (祁悦章) from the Pengyang County Office of Chronicles Compilation both of the cash coins were deemed to be authentic specimens. Of ancient cash coins that are held in the collection of the Pengyang County Office of Cultural Relics (彭阳县文物馆) over half of them were produced by either the Tangut Western Xia dynasty and Song dynasty.	Western Xia and Northern Song dynasties period	
June 16, 2015	Yuncheng "salt lake" (运城盐池), Yuncheng, Shanxi		500 clay moulds	It was reported on June 16, 2015, by the Yuncheng News Network (运城新闻网) that two bird photographers and enthusiasts of the "salt lake culture", Mr. Jing Xiaoxiong (景晓雄) and Mr. Zhang Xiaobie (张小别) had discovered 500 clay moulds used to cast iron cash coins during the Song dynasty period. The clay moulds were located at the Yuncheng "salt lake" (运城盐池), which is sometimes known as "China's Dead Sea" (中国死海) located near the city of Yuncheng, Shanxi. While quite a number of these clay moulds were in good condition with very distinct inscriptions, many of the around five hundred clay moulds are in poor condition. The inscriptions on the discovered Song dynasty era coin moulds include Yuanfeng Tongbao (元豐通寶), Chongning Tongbao (崇寧通寶), Daguan Tongbao (大觀通寶), Zhenghe Tongbao (政和通寶), and seal script Zhenghe Zhongbao (政和重寶). The discovery of the clay coin moulds is notable because no historical documents have ever mentioned that the city of Hedong (河東), the name of Yuncheng during the Song dynasty period, had a mint, nor have any ruins of a mint been discovered in the area. The discovery of the clay coin moulds will further encourage the study of Song dynasty ruins in the area of Yuncheng, Shanxi to search for the possible existence of an ancient cash coin mint.	Northern Song dynasty period	
August 1, 2015	Qianjiang District, Chongqing		4,000 cash coins cast in a period of about 1400 years.	On August 1, 2015, in the Qianjiang District, Chongqing, a woman named Wang Meiying (王美英), while collecting wood in the mountain area, had discovered a hole in which a large quantity of old cash coins were buried. The cash coins found in the hole weighed about 30 catties and consisted of over 4,000 cash coins, the inscriptions found on the coins cover a period of about 1400 years. The hoard includes Tang dynasty era Kaiyuan Tongbao (開元通寶) cash coins, Song dynasty era Jingde Yuanbao (景德元寶) and Yuanfeng Tongbao (元豐通寶) cash coins, and Ming dynasty era Chongzhen Tongbao (崇禎通寶) cash coins. But 80% of the hoard consists of Qing dynasty coinage, namely Kangxi Tongbao (康熙通寶), Qianlong Tongbao (乾隆通寶), and Xianfeng Tongbao (咸豐通寶) cash coins. It was reported by a 75-year-old villager from the area named Ms. Wan Jixiang (万继湘), that this area of the Qianjiang District did not use cash coins in the past and that the area housed no landlords or government officials that could have accumulated such an amount of wealth. As the area has had a long history of criminality, it was speculated by some locals that the cash coins may have been buried there long ago by bandits (土匪) who were on the run.	Qing Xianfeng period	
August 21, 2015	Cishi Pagoda (慈氏塔) located in Yueyang, Hunan		Over a thousand Tang and Northern Song dynasty cash coins.	On August 21, 2015, it was reported on by the government-owned Yueyang Daily (岳阳日报) that over a thousand Tang and Northern Song dynasty cash coins were discovered during the renovation of the Cishi Pagoda (慈氏塔) located in Yueyang, Hunan. Among the cash coins are a number of early Kaiyuan Tongbao (開元通寶) cash coins from the Tang dynasty, as well as several Northern Song dynasty era inscriptions such as Chunhua Yuanbao (淳化元寶), Xianping Yuanbao (咸平元寶), Tianxi Tongbao (天禧通寶), and Tiansheng Yuanbao (天聖元寶). Ou Jifan (欧继凡), the Deputy-Director of the Yueyang Municipal Office of Cultural Relics (市文物管理处副主任), stated that the date major restoration was confirmed to be 1066 through an analysis of the cash coins. Ou Jifan further stated that there was an ancient tradition of burying coins during the construction and renovation of pagodas in China, as in the past people had believed that coins offered a form of protection to the pagoda that was being constructed or renovated, and that they furthermore would serve as a type of sacrifice to the heavens, and that the cash coins expressed the hope for peace. Earlier during the same restoration of the Cishi Pagoda in 2015 a covered alms bowl with the inscription "Da Song Zhiping San Nian" (大宋治平三年, "the 3rd year of Zhiping of the Great Song") was discovered, which also indicates that the pagoda underwent a major renovation in the year 1066.	1066	
September 24, 2015	Zhaojiazhuang Cemetery, Shandong		Cash coins from various periods and silver sycees issued under the Jurchen Jin dynasty.	It was reported on September 24, 2015, that a number of cash coins had been found in tombs located in tombs during excavation work undertaken by the Jinan City Archaeological Research Institute nearby the Zhaojiazhuang Cemetery, Shandong. The tombs yielded cash coins produced during the Song, Tang, and Manchu Qing dynasties with the latest examples being Xianfeng era cash coins. A tomb identified as "Grave M1" also contained silver sycees issued under the Jurchen Jin dynasty.	Various periods	
November 2015	The tomb of the Marquis of Haihun in Xinjian, Nanchang, Jiangxi		25 gold hoofs (a type of sycee) and 50 very large gold coins	It was reported on November 17, 2015, by the Xinhua News Agency that at the tomb of the Marquis of Haihun in Xinjian, Jiangxi a number of gold coins had been found. Excavations of the tomb have been conducted since 2011. The gold objects unearthed included some 25 gold hoofs (a type of sycee) with varying weights from 40 to 250 grams and 50 very large gold coins weighing about 250 grams each. The gold coinages were packed inside of three different boxes that were placed under a bed that was located inside of the main chamber of the tomb. According to Yang Jie, who leads the excavation team, the gold objects were likely awarded to the Marquis of Haihun by the emperor himself.	Han dynasty period	

=== 2016 ===
==== 2016 (Mainland China) ====
List of 2016 coin hoards in Mainland China
Date of discovery	Place of discovery	Image	Content	Long description of the find and notes	Date (if known)	Current location (if known)
Saturday February 27, 2016	Nanzuo Village, Xingping, Shaanxi		459 kilograms of Xin dynasty cash coins	It was reported on Thursday March 3, 2016, by China.org.cn that local newspapers had covered a story on Tuesday March 1, 2016, where a villager surnamed Zhang in Nanzuo Village, Xingping, Shaanxi had unearthed 459 kilograms of Xin dynasty cash coins. While Mr. Zhang was levelling the land on Saturday February 27, 2016, with a spade, after digging for about half a meter he had discovered the coins. All of the discovered Wang Mang period copper-alloy coins have centre holes and can further be subdivided into three kinds, some have square centre holes, others have rectangular centre holes, and others had round ones. After the local police was called, a local police officer with the cultural relics inspection detachment named Feng Pengru had told the Xinhua News Agency that they were all produced during the Xin dynasty. After the cash coins that were found in Nanzuo Village were cleaned and evaluated from the site by a team of archaeologists they were given to the local museum.	Xin dynasty period	
April 27, 2016	Rongpo Monastery, Tingri County, Xigazê, Tibet Autonomous Region		5,500 Tibetan coins.	Over 5,500 coins (weighing 26.6 kg in total) were unearthed at the Rongpo Monastery located near the base of Mount Everest in Tibet. The coins were found during a renovation and are believed to be two centuries old. The coins are round and bear floral patterns.		

=== 2017 ===
==== 2017 (Mainland China) ====
List of 2017 coin hoards in Mainland China
Date of discovery	Place of discovery	Image	Content	Long description of the find and notes	Date (if known)	Current location (if known)
2017	Hall of Mental Cultivation, Forbidden City, Beijing		A "Coin dragon" (錢龍 / 钱龙, "Money dragon").	On 4 December 2020 Mr. Zhou Qian (周乾), a researcher at the Palace Museum, reported in the Science and Technology Daily that in 2017 a "coin dragon" made of Qianlong Tongbao (乾隆通寶) cash coins was discovered at the Hall of Mental Cultivation during a renovation. The coin dragon was found to be attached to the side of the ridge beam supporting the roof. In imperial China a grand ceremony always took place at the Hall of Mental Cultivation known as the Shang Liang (traditional Chinese: 上樑; simplified Chinese: 上梁; pinyin: Shàng liáng) when the main roof beam of a palace building was raised and installed.	The Qianlong reign period (1735–1796).	Palace Museum, Beijing
2017	Hall of Mental Cultivation, Forbidden City, Beijing		A treasure box (traditional Chinese: 寶匣; simplified Chinese: 宝匣; pinyin: Bǎo xiá) attributed to the year Jiaqing 6 (嘉慶六年) containing various treasures including 5 sycees made from 5 different types of metal and 24 golden Tianxia Taiping (天下太平) cash coins.	The discovered treasure box included an image of a five-clawed azure dragon, who is one of the dragon gods of the Five Deities (五帝) which is associated with the five colours (五色), five phases (五行), etc. The treasure box is 27 centimeters (10.6 inches) on the sides (making it square in shape) and 6.5 centimeters (2.6 inches) in height. It was uncovered during a renovation of the Hall of Mental Cultivation and was sealed under a roof. The treasure box contained various items inside of it including Buddhist sutras, gems in five colors (五色寶石), satins in five colors (五色緞), silk threads in five colors (五色絲線), five spices (五香), five herbal medicines (五藥), and five cereal seeds (五谷). All of which were in a bad condition. The treasure box also contained 5 sycees made of 5 different metals, namely tin, iron, copper, silver, and gold as well as 24 golden Tianxia Taiping (天下太平) palace cash coins. These palace cash coins contained the inscription "May the world be at peace" written in Chinese characters on one side and in the Manchu language on the other side. The Tianxia Taiping palace cash coins found in the treasure box are 16 karats of gold and range from about 25.4 to 28.4 millimetres in diameter, they have a thickness of 1.7 to 2.1 millimeters, and weigh from 10.7 to 11.36 grams.	1801	Palace Museum, Beijing
February 2017	Gan River in Xingan County, Jiangxi		Over 500 kilograms of Qing dynasty cash coins	It was reported on January 5, 2017, that local villagers had dug up over 500 kilograms of Qing dynasty cash coins near the Gan River in Xingan County, Jiangxi. The villagers had occupied an area of 30 square metre and were excavating the site without permission, most of the villagers at the site were pensioners and children. Eventually the local police force had to call in 20 reinforcements to cordon off the area so archaeologists could excavate the area later.	Qing dynasty period	
March 2017	Minjiang River in Meishan, Sichuan		Over 10,000 gold and silver objects	In March 2017 a Xiwang Shanggong (西王賞功) cash coin issued by Zhang Xianzhong was unearthed at the Jiangkou stretch of the Minjiang River in Meishan, Sichuan. The findings at the river included over 10,000 individual items of gold and silver including a number of golden and silver sycees.	Transition from Ming to Qing	
July 2017	Xi'an, Shaanxi		2 gold Eastern Roman coins and 1 silver Sasanian coin	On July 7, 2017, the state-run tabloid Global Times reported that the Shaanxi Provincial Institute of Archaeology (SPIA) had uncovered two Eastern Roman gold coins as well as a Sasanian coin inside of a tomb in Xi'an, Shaanxi. The tomb belonged to Lu Chou, a Western Wei dynasty nobleman who died in 538. The golden Eastern Roman coins were issued under Anastasius I and Justinian I, respectively, and the silver Sassanian coin was issued Peroz I.	Western Wei dynasty period	
October 22, 2017	Chacun Village, Fuliang County, Jingdezhen, Jiangxi		300,000 Song dynasty cash coins (weighing around 5.6 tonnes)	It was reported on October 27, 2017, by China Daily that about 300,000 cash coins (weighing around 5.6 tonnes) have been unearthed from under a residential house, after it had been discovered by a villager during the rebuilding of his old home, in Chacun Village, Fuliang County, Jingdezhen, Jiangxi. Archaeologists had completed the excavation of the site on October 22, 2017. Several local villagers noted that folk tales claimed that the area was owned by a wealthy landlord a millennium prior to the find, which might be the origin of the cash coins. Feng Ruqin, curator of Fuliang Museum, stated that the cash coins must have probably been collected and placed there by a folk organisation as the nominal value of the cash coins were too small to do with the landlord. The cash coins found at the site were attributed to the Song dynasty. According to the South China Morning Post Jingdezhen has been referred to as the "capital of porcelain" since the 3rd century.	Song dynasty period	The Fuliang Museum
Monday November 13, 2017	Near Zhoukou, Henan		Han, Xin, and Song dynasty coinages.	On Monday November 13, 2017, the Henan Cultural Relics Department announced that an excavation near Zhoukou, Henan had unearthed a large number of tombs and cash coins that date to the Han dynasty period. Over 120 different tombs were discovered, of which 105 dated to the Han dynasty period and 15 to the Song dynasty and Qing dynasty periods. Most of the cash coins unearthed at the site were Wu Zhu (五銖) cash coins, while also a number of Xin dynasty spade coins issued under Wang Mang, and song Dynasty cash coins were also found in a number of tombs.	Various periods	

=== 2018 ===
==== 2018 (Mainland China) ====
List of 2018 coin hoards in Mainland China
Date of discovery	Place of discovery	Image	Content	Long description of the find and notes	Date (if known)	Current location (if known)
July 15, 2018	Sanmenxia, Henan		504 spade coins	On July 15, 2018, it was reported by the Xinhua News Agency that 504 Spring and Autumn period spade coins were unearthed at a construction site in Sanmenxia, Henan. The spades were preserved inside of a clay pottery cooker. Of the total of 504 spades that were unearthed, 434 had remained intact. Li Shuqian, the head of the local museum, noted that it was very rare for such a large amount of ancient Chinese coinage to remain preserved in such a good state.	Spring and Autumn period	
October 26, 2018	Tianba Village, Guanba town, Qijiang District, Chongqing		Around 3,000 iron Southern Song dynasty cash coins	It was reported on October 30, 2018, by CQCB (重庆日报客户端) that a coin hoard of around 3,000 Southern Song dynasty period cash coins had been discovered at a construction site along S434 in Tianba Village, Guanba town, Qijiang District, Chongqing. The cash coins were initially discovered on October 26, 2018, after a few construction workers had noticed the presence of round coins with square centre holes among the rocks they were clearing. Liao Xiaobo, the On-Site Principal of Highway Maintenance Station of Chongqing Traffic, noted that these cash coins were found over 20 meters in the ground. Archaeologists managed to dig up around 3,000 cash coins at the site. At the time of the report all the unearthed cash coins were made from iron. The archaeologists suspect that the coins were produced during the Southern Song dynasty period but suspect that they may have been produced earlier. Linghu Keqiang, the head of the Museum of Chongqing Wansheng Economic and Technological Development Zone, stated that the find would aid with research on immigrant culture to the area and the local socio-economic development of Wansheng as it reflected the economic development level of the area at the time.	Southern Song dynasty period	The Chongqing Museum

== 2020s ==
=== 2020 ===
==== 2020 (Mainland China) ====
List of 2020 coin hoards in Mainland China
Date of discovery	Place of discovery	Image	Content	Long description of the find and notes	Date (if known)	Current location (if known)
Sunday March 15, 2020	Zhanghuabao Village, Zhangtai, Wei County, Xingtai, Hebei		Over 1000 bronze Northern Song dynasty cash coins, primarily with the inscriptions Daguan Tongbao (大觀通寶) and Zhenghe Tongbao (政和通寶).	It was reported on March 17, 2020, by the Weixian Cultural Preservation Institute that one of their staff members had found the location of a temple site in Zhanghuabao Village, Zhangtai, Wei County, Xingtai, Hebei. On the March 15, 2020, a cultural relic enthusiast had found several ancient Chinese cash coins around the area, afterwards the man took a few excavation tools and started digging around the area and found the location of more cash coins. Villagers then reported the find to the Weixian Cultural Preservation Institute who immediately excavated the site. At the temple site over a thousand Northern Song dynasty period cash coins were unearthed by the Weixian Cultural Preservation Institute. Most of the discovered cash coins had suffered from corrosion and were rusted together. Wang Xiaohui, the director of the Weixian Cultural Preservation Institute, stated that the clean-up revealed that the majority of the cash coins date to the Northern Song dynasty and that the most common inscriptions were Daguan Tongbao (大觀通寶) and Zhenghe Tongbao (政和通寶).	Southern Song dynasty	
May 2020 (Excavations began in 2015)	Chengdu, Sichuan		86 burial objects and hundreds of coins inside of a late Han dynasty tomb designated the "M94 Cliff Tomb".	In May of the year 2020 the Chengdu Institute of Cultural Relics and Archaeology reported on the findings in various tombs located in Chengdu, Sichuan which range from the Warring States period, the Qin dynasty, the Han dynasty, the Five Dynasties and Ten Kingdoms period, the Ming dynasty, and the Manchu Qing dynasty. Among these finds hundreds of cash coins dating to the late Han dynasty period were discovered. Various other items were also discovered inside of these burial sites.	475 BCE–1912 CE	

=== 2021 ===
==== 2021 (Mainland China) ====
List of 2021 coin hoards in Mainland China
Date of discovery	Place of discovery	Image	Content	Long description of the find and notes	Date (if known)	Current location (if known)
Findings published in August 2021 (Excavations between 2015 and 2019)	The walled and moated city of Guanzhuang (established about 800 B.C.), Henan		2 spade coins and dozens of clay moulds used to cast them. One of the spade coins was in near-perfect condition. (Note: This specimen of a spade coin—which look like shrunken versions of the gardening tool—was just shy of 6 inches in length and about 2.5 inches in width, the bronze spade coin weighed about 27 grams.)	The spade coins and moulds were discovered at the Guanzhuang Mint were attributed to have been produced between 640 BCE and no later than 550 BCE, which according to Hao Zhao, an archaeologist at Zhengzhou University, in an article published in Antiquity makes it the world's oldest known mint. Zhao stated that while other research has dated coins from the Kingdom of Lydia (a historical country in present-day Turkey) to have been created as early as 630 BCE, he notes that the earliest mint known to have produced Lydian coins dates to sometime between 575 BCE and 550 BCE, which (if true) makes the Guanzhang Mint the world's oldest known mint. George Selgin, director of the Center for Monetary and Financial Alternatives at the Cato Institute, says while he notes that it is an impressive find, "It doesn't change our basic understanding of when the first coins were produced. And it doesn't necessarily mean that China did it first." saying that the find doesn't necessarily prove that the Chinese invented money before the Lydians did. In contrast Bill Maurer, a professor of anthropology at the University of California Irvine and director of the Institute for Money, Technology and Financial Inclusion, noted that the completeness of the find gives weight to the assertions made in Antiquity.	640 BCE~550 BCE (Spring and Autumn period)	

=== 2022 ===
==== 2022 (Mainland China) ====
List of 2022 coin hoards in Mainland China
Date of discovery	Place of discovery	Image	Content	Long description of the find and notes	Date (if known)	Current location (if known)
23 October 2022	Shuangdun Village, Jianhu County, Yancheng city, Jiangsu province		1.5 tonnes of cash coins dating back to the Tang and Song dynasties.	During an excavation in Shuangdun Village, Jianhu County of Yancheng City in the province of Jiangsu a coin hoard consisting of 1.5 tonnes of cash coins was discovered. In ancient China, such treasure hoards were often buried in the ground by their owners to preserve precious porcelain objects, cash coins, metal tools, and other valuables. These bronze cash coins, mostly dating to the Song dynasty period, were connected to each other with a series of straw ropes and were neatly layered and paved inside of a pit mouth. This pit mouth of the coin hoard was square in shape and measured at 1.63 meters in length, 1.58 meters in width, and 0.5 meters in depth. Because these cash coins still had clear inscriptions and we're all well-preserved they can serve as important value for future archaeological and numismatic research. In total 70 wells were also discovered around the coin hoard. The location of the near a battle frontline of the Jin–Song Wars, for this reason researchers speculate if the excavation site may have belonged to a hutted military camp from this period.	Jin–Song Wars	

=== 2023 ===
==== 2023 (Taiwan) ====
List of 2023 coin hoards in the free area of the Republic of China
Date of discovery	Place of discovery	Image	Content	Long description of the find and notes	Date (if known)	Current location (if known)
15 May 2023	Chongde (崇德) area, Xiulin, Hualien County, Taiwan province		A trove of artifacts (such as bracelets and agate beads), including cash coins dating to the Song dynasty 900 years ago.	Wu Chin-yi (吳勁毅), the director of the Hualien Cultural Affairs Bureau stated that while digging at a construction site to lay a foundation, workers stumbled upon what appeared to be the corner of a tomb. The owner of the allowed the Hualien Cultural Affairs Bureau to investigate the site where they found an abundance of items including Song dynasty period cash coins. The vast number of artifacts delayed the construction work by 2 months. A number of items in the hoard are dated to the middle of the Taiwanese iron age and proved that the indigenous people living there may have had more extensive trade with China than was previously thought. However, there's still some debate if the cash coins were deposited there at the time they were in circulation or disposed there at a much later time.		Hualien Archeological Museum

== See also ==
- List of coin hoards in Vietnam
