= Jianyang =

Jianyang may refer to the following places in China:

- Jianyang, Sichuan (简阳市), county-level city under the administration of Chengdu, Sichuan
- Jianyang District (建阳区), Nanping, Fujian
- Jianyang, Jiangsu (建阳镇), town in and subdivision of Jianhu County, Jiangsu
