= Longgang, Jiangsu =

Longgang 龙冈镇
- Town
- Interactive map of Longgang
- Coordinates: 33°21′29″N 120°02′31″E
- Country: China
- Province: Jiangsu
- Prefecture-level city: Yancheng
- District: Yandu

Area
  - Total: 93.51 km^{2} (36.10 sq mi)

Population
  - Total: 76,920
  - Density: 822.6/km^{2} (2,130/sq mi)
- Time zone: UTC+8 (China Standard)
- Postal code: 224011
- Area code: 0515
- Website: http://www.yclg.gov.cn/

Longgang (simplified Chinese: 龙冈; traditional Chinese: 龍岡; pinyin: Lónggāng) is a town under the jurisdiction of Yandu District, Yancheng, in northeastern Jiangsu province, People's Republic of China.

== Geography ==
Longgang is located around 9 kilometres (5.6 mi) west of the downtown area of Yancheng, bordering Jianhu County to the north. The town has an area of 93.51 square kilometres (36.10 sq mi), with around 77,000 permanent residents. It administers 31 village-level divisions.
