= Yandu, Yancheng =

Yandu 盐都区
- District
- Location in Jiangsu
- Coordinates: 33°16′37″N 119°57′14″E
- Country: People's Republic of China
- Province: Jiangsu
- Prefecture-level city: Yancheng

Area
  - Total: 1,015 km^{2} (392 sq mi)

Population (2009)
  - Total: 752,300
  - Density: 741.2/km^{2} (1,920/sq mi)
- Time zone: UTC+8 (China Standard)
- Postal code: 224006

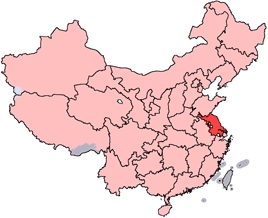
Location of Jiangsu Province

Yandu District (simplified Chinese: 盐都区; traditional Chinese: 鹽都區; pinyin: Yándū Qū; lit. 'salt capital') is one of three districts of Yancheng, Jiangsu province, China. (The other two are Tinghu District and Dafeng District).

Yandu District occupies southwestern suburbs of Yancheng.

== Administrative division ==
Yandu District is divided into 4 subdistricts and 8 towns.

4 Subdistricts

- Panhuang (潘黄街道)
- Yanlong (盐龙街道)
- Xindu (新都街道)
- Zhangzhuang (张庄街道)

8 Towns

- Longgang (龙冈镇)
- Dazonghu (大纵湖镇)
- Dagang (大冈镇)
- Louwang (楼王镇)
- Xuefu (学富镇)
- Shangzhuang (尚庄镇)
- Qinnan (秦南镇)
- Guomeng (郭猛镇)
