= Huoluochaideng =

The Horočhaidam (Mongolian: ᠬᠣᠷᠣᠭ᠎ᠠ ᠴᠠᡳᡩᠠᠮ) or Huoluochaideng (Chinese: 霍洛柴登) city site in Hanggin Banner, Inner Mongolia, is known for the massive quantity of coins (3500 kg) that were found there. The coins included Wu Zhu cash coins from the Han dynasty as well as coinage produced under Wang Mang's Xin dynasty.

== The site ==
The site appears to be the ruins of a city, possibly from the time of the Han and Xin dynasties. The site was first excavated in August 2012 by the Cultural Relics and Archaeological Institute of Inner Mongolia and Hangjin Banner Cultural Relics Administration Office - three coin hoards were found within the site, and the remains of a major coin-casting workshop were found in the northwestern part of the site. Further excavation was carried out in 2013, when four coin-casting kilns were found of which two (Y1 and Y4) were well-preserved. Over 150 pieces of clay coin models and 20 pieces of clay moulds were found in and around the kilns, as well as coins, ceramics, bronze and iron objects, stone tool, slag and animal bones. The coins are mostly issues of Wang Mang, in the first decades of the first century AD: daquan wushi, xiaoquan zhiyi, huoquan, banliang and wuzhu. The coin models, moulds and coins suggest that the site may have been in use from 157 BC to AD 23.

== See also ==
- Ancient Chinese coinage
- Xin dynasty coinage
