= Chiayi Botanical Garden =

Botanical garden in East, Chiayi City, Taiwan

- 嘉義植物園
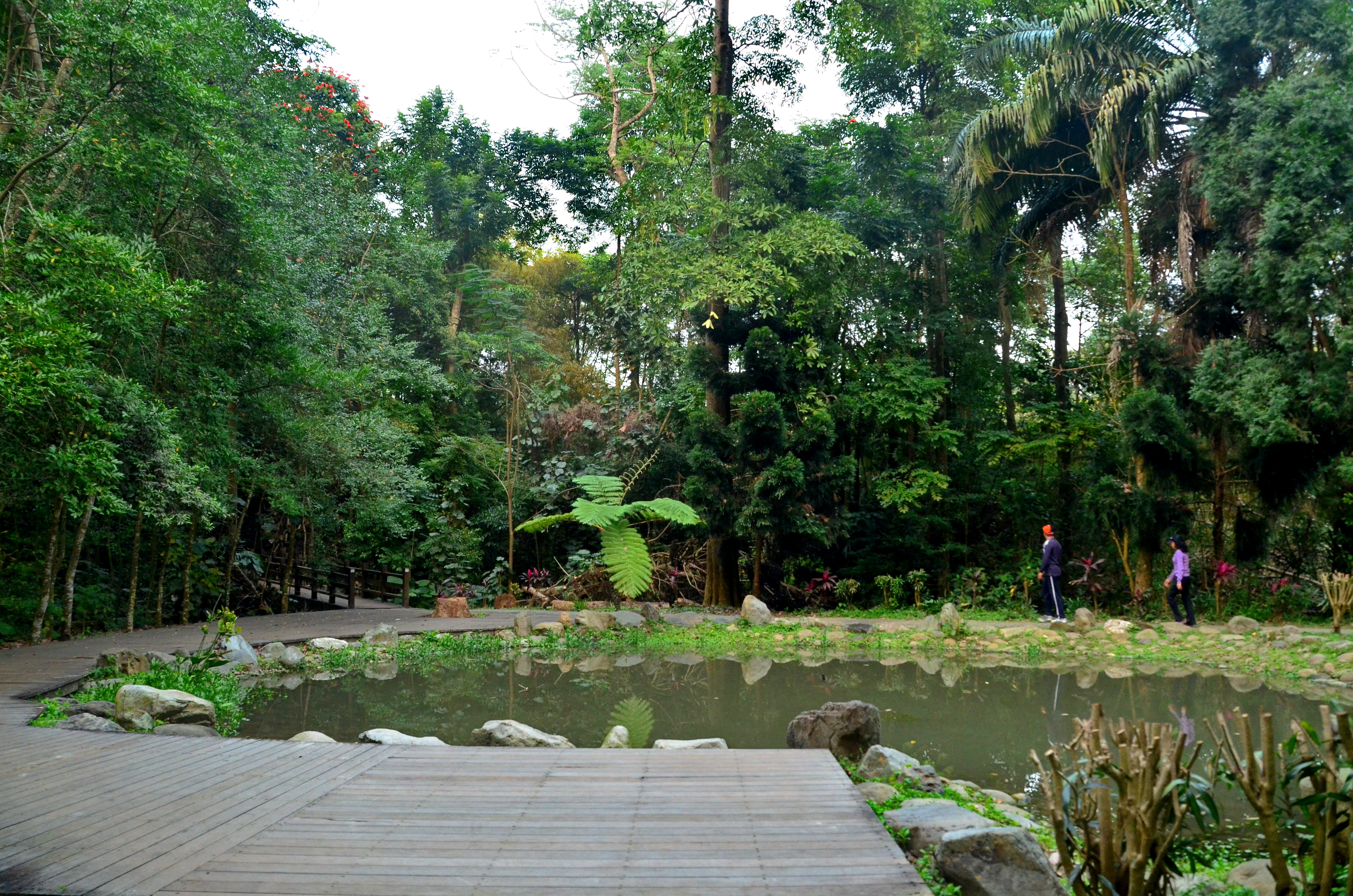
- Interactive map of Chiayi Botanical Garden
- Type: botanical garden
- Location: East, Chiayi City, Taiwan
- Coordinates: 23°29′00.9″N 120°28′08.7″E
- Area: 8.6 hectares (21 acres)
- Opened: 1908
- Owner: Taiwan Forestry Research Institute
- Collections: 140 tree species

The Chiayi Botanical Garden (traditional Chinese: 嘉義植物園; simplified Chinese: 嘉义植物园; pinyin: Jiāyì Zhíwùyuán) is a botanical garden in East District, Chiayi City, Taiwan belongs to the Taiwan Forestry Research Institute of Council of Agriculture.

== History ==
The botanical garden was established in 1908.

== Geology ==
The botanical garden spreads across an 8.6 hectares of land. It is an experimental ground for planning and developing economical tropical trees. Currently there are 140 tree species in the garden, which is further classified into 47 families and 107 classes.

== See also ==
- List of parks in Taiwan
