= Jianhu County =

Jianhu 建湖县
- County
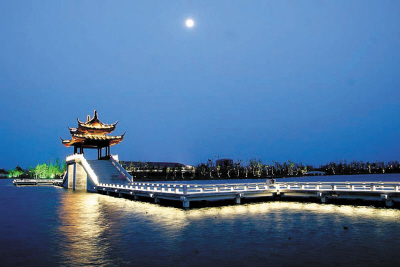
- Shuanghu Park

- Location in Jiangsu
- Coordinates: 33°28′59″N 119°49′48″E
- Country: People's Republic of China
- Province: Jiangsu
- Prefecture-level city: Yancheng

Area
  - Total: 1,154 km^{2} (446 sq mi)

Population (2016)
  - Total: 800,600
  - Density: 693.8/km^{2} (1,797/sq mi)
- Time zone: UTC+8 (China Standard)
- Postal code: 224700
- Area code: 0515

Jianhu County (simplified Chinese: 建湖县; traditional Chinese: 建湖縣; pinyin: Jiànhú Xiàn) is under the administration of Yancheng, Jiangsu province, China. It borders the prefecture-level cities of Huai'an and Yangzhou to the west.

The main town in Jianhu is commonly just called Jianhu, and sometimes Huduo (湖垛) or Hutu (糊涂).

== Administrative divisions ==
At present, Jianhu County includes 12 towns.

- Jinhu (近湖镇 :Jìn-hú)
- Jianyang (建阳镇 :Jiàn-yáng)
- Jiangying (蒋营镇 :Jiǎng-yíng)
- Hengji (恒济镇 :Héng-jì)
- Yanhe (沿河镇 :Yán-hé)
- Lugou (芦沟镇 :Lú-gōu)
- Qingfeng (庆丰镇 :Qìng-fēng)
- Shanggang (上冈镇 :Shàng-gāng)
- Gangxi (冈西镇 :Gāng-xī)
- Baota (宝塔镇 :Bǎo-tǎ)
- Gaozuo (高作镇 :Gāo-zuò)
- Yandan (颜单镇 :Yán dān)- is new town.

Former Towns

- Yanshan (颜单镇 :Yán-shàn) - is merged to other.
- Gangdong (冈东镇 :Gāng-dōng) - is merged to other.
- Caoyankou (草堰口镇 :Cǎo-yàn-kǒu) - is merged to other.
- Zhongzhuang (钟庄镇 :Zhōng-zhuāng) - is merged to other.

== Climate ==
Climate data for Jianhu, elevation 2 m (6.6 ft), (1991–2020 normals, extremes 1966–present)
Month	Jan	Feb	Mar	Apr	May	Jun	Jul	Aug	Sep	Oct	Nov	Dec	Year
Record high °C (°F)	20.1 (68.2)	25.2 (77.4)	32.5 (90.5)	32.2 (90.0)	35.1 (95.2)	37.1 (98.8)	38.7 (101.7)	38.2 (100.8)	35.5 (95.9)	31.4 (88.5)	27.3 (81.1)	20.6 (69.1)	38.7 (101.7)
Mean daily maximum °C (°F)	6.2 (43.2)	8.8 (47.8)	13.7 (56.7)	19.9 (67.8)	25.3 (77.5)	28.8 (83.8)	30.9 (87.6)	30.5 (86.9)	26.9 (80.4)	22.0 (71.6)	15.4 (59.7)	8.7 (47.7)	19.8 (67.6)
Daily mean °C (°F)	1.8 (35.2)	4.0 (39.2)	8.5 (47.3)	14.4 (57.9)	20.0 (68.0)	24.2 (75.6)	27.3 (81.1)	26.9 (80.4)	22.6 (72.7)	17.0 (62.6)	10.6 (51.1)	4.0 (39.2)	15.1 (59.2)
Mean daily minimum °C (°F)	−1.6 (29.1)	0.3 (32.5)	4.3 (39.7)	9.7 (49.5)	15.4 (59.7)	20.4 (68.7)	24.4 (75.9)	24.0 (75.2)	19.2 (66.6)	12.9 (55.2)	6.7 (44.1)	0.5 (32.9)	11.4 (52.4)
Record low °C (°F)	−11.3 (11.7)	−13.1 (8.4)	−8.0 (17.6)	−0.4 (31.3)	5.3 (41.5)	12.2 (54.0)	18.2 (64.8)	16.4 (61.5)	9.1 (48.4)	0.8 (33.4)	−5.7 (21.7)	−11.4 (11.5)	−13.1 (8.4)
Average precipitation mm (inches)	30.0 (1.18)	33.6 (1.32)	51.5 (2.03)	46.7 (1.84)	73.9 (2.91)	130.9 (5.15)	215.8 (8.50)	180.6 (7.11)	87.3 (3.44)	46.7 (1.84)	49.3 (1.94)	28.0 (1.10)	974.3 (38.36)
Average precipitation days (≥ 0.1 mm)	6.3	7.0	7.9	7.7	9.0	9.1	12.9	12.9	8.1	6.6	7.0	5.6	100.1
Average snowy days	2.6	2.5	0.8	0	0	0	0	0	0	0	0.5	0.8	7.2
Average relative humidity (%)	72	72	70	71	72	75	83	83	80	75	74	72	75
Mean monthly sunshine hours	144.7	143.3	174.0	197.3	206.2	166.0	177.2	191.2	179.6	179.4	154.0	153.3	2,066.2
Percentage possible sunshine	46	46	47	50	48	39	41	47	49	51	50	50	47
Source: China Meteorological Administration all-time extreme temperature

== Education ==
There are two key senior high schools in Jianhu County. One is Jianhu Senior High School, which is located in Downtown Jianhu. The other one is Shanggang Senior High School, which is located in Downtown Shanggang.

== Transportation ==
Recent development of transportation infrastructure in Northern Jiangsu has greatly impacted Great Yancheng area, including Jianhu. The Jianhu train station opened in July 2004, and Jianhu now offers overnight train service (on Train Z156) to Beijing.
