= Xinjiang coins =

Coinage used in Xinjiang, China

There have been various kinds of coins produced throughout the history of Xinjiang using the styles of contemporary Chinese cash coins as well as Persian and Islamic coinages. As not many records exist from the ancient monarchies of Xinjiang the study of its coinage has determined when which rules reigned and the state of the economy based on metallurgical analyses.

== Pre-Islamic coins ==
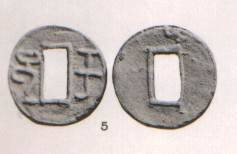
A Yu Fang (于方) cash coin produced by the Kingdom of Khotan, illustrated by Aurel Stein.

Among the earliest coins made in the Tarim Basin were the so-called "horse coins" of the "Yu Tian" kingdom near modern Hotan, also known as the "Sino-Kharosthi coins of Khotan". These were struck around the second and third centuries with a horse image on one side and legends in Han (Chinese) and Kharosthi scripts.

Coins with both Chinese and Karoshthi inscriptions have been found in the southern Tarim Basin.

Cast coins made in imitation of Chinese coins were also produced in the Tarim Basin. The kingdom of Qiuzi (near modern Kucha) produced coins similar to the Chinese "Wu Zhu" pieces (see Kucha coinage).

In the Chu valley in Central Asia Tang dynasty era Chinese coins continued to be copied and minted after the Chinese left the area.

An indelible impression was left on eastern Xinjiang's administration and culture in Turfan by the Chinese Tang rule which consisted of settlements, and military farms in addition to the spread of Chinese influence such as the sancai three colour glaze in Central Asia and Western Eurasia, in Xinjiang there was continued circulation of Chinese coins.

The title Malik al-Mashriq wa'l-Ṣīn was bestowed by the 'Abbāsid Caliph upon the Tamghaj Khan, the Samarqand Khaqan Yūsuf b. Ḥasan and after that coins and literature had the title Tamghaj Khan appear on them and were continued to be used by the Qarakhanids and the Transoxania-based Western Qarakhanids and some Eastern Qarakhanid monarchs, so therefore the Kara-Khitan (Western Liao)'s usage of Chinese things such as Chinese coins, the Chinese writing system, tablets, seals, Chinese art products like porcelain, mirrors, jade and other Chinese customs were designed to appeal to the local Central Asian Muslim population since the Muslims in the area regarded Central Asia as former Chinese territories and viewed links with China as prestigious and Western Liao's rule over Muslim Central Asia caused the view that Central Asia was a Chinese territory to reinforce upon the Muslims; "Turkestan" and Chīn (China) were identified with each other by Fakhr al-Dīn Mubārak Shāh with China being identified as the country where the cities of Balāsāghūn and Kashgar were located.

Muslim writers wrote that "Tamghājī silver coins" (sawmhā-yi ṭamghājī) were present in Balkh while tafghājī was used by the writer Ḥabībī, the Qarakhānid leader Böri Tigin (Ibrāhīm Tamghāj Khān) was possibly the one who minted the coins.

In the Turfan Basin, the Buddhist Uyghur Kingdom of Qocho also cast coins in Chinese style, but with Old Uyghur language legends. The preceding city-state of Gaochang made its own coins in Chinese style, with the legend "Gao Chang Ji Li" (高昌吉利, Gāochāng jí lì).

== Islamic coins ==
In the Tarim Basin, (in present-day Xinjiang), Islamic, Arabic-language coins were struck under the Kara-Khanid Khanate, Chagatai Khanate, Sayyidiya (Yarkand or Moghul Khanate), and even by the Buddhist Dzungar Khanate. The Dzungars minted pūl (a red copper coin).

== Red cash (Qing imperial cast coins) ==
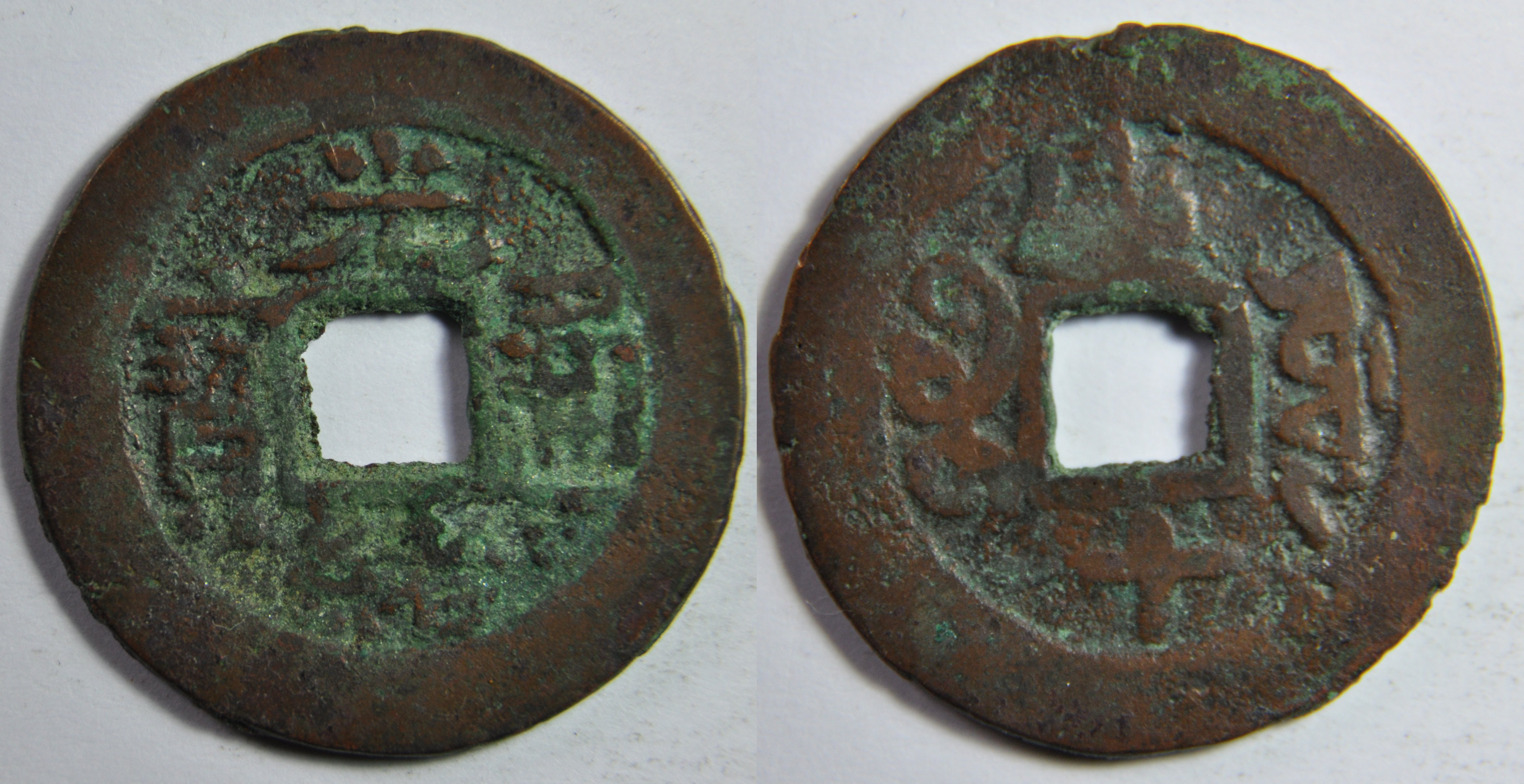
A Guangxu era red cash coin with a nominal value of 10 wén.

The Manchu-led Qing dynasty began casting coins in the far-Western region of Xinjiang (sometimes transliterated as Sinkiang) in 1760, only one year after the Qianlong Emperor's generals conquered the region's capitols of Kashgar and Yarkand. Not only did this primarily Muslim and Turkic-speaking region represent a distinct cultural landscape for the empire, but also a special economic environment. The many differences between the coinages of Xinjiang and the rest of China reflected the special demands of governing this area. The coins cast in Xinjiang were made from copper, rather than the brass used for the rest of the empire's coinage, leading to the nickname "red cash." These copper coins were valued at five of the standard cash, and provided some continuity with the monetary system used under the region's previous rulers, the Dzungar Oirat Mongol Dzungar Khanate. Most of the red cash also displayed mint names in the local Turki language. The coins had writing in Chinese, Manchu, and Turki. Lying far from the empire's center, Xinjiang was somewhat loosely governed by the court, and this is reflected in the great variety of coin types produced, some of them quite innovative. In spite of frequent rebellions and invasions, the coinage of red cash continued on and off through the nineteenth century and into the beginning of the twentieth. The final examples of red cash were cast in 1909 in the name of the Last Emperor, Puyi, using the same casting technology employed by Chinese mints for 2000 years.

The red cash of Xinjiang are quite popular among Chinese collectors for their abundance of unusual types, and for their connection to the Silk Road and Western Regions history and mythology. Some of the coins of Qing Xinjiang represent surprising breaks from Chinese coinage traditions. Most types are trilingual, and errors were abundant. Among the numerous types of red cash there are both great rarities and common pieces with strong historical significance.

== Machine-made coins ==
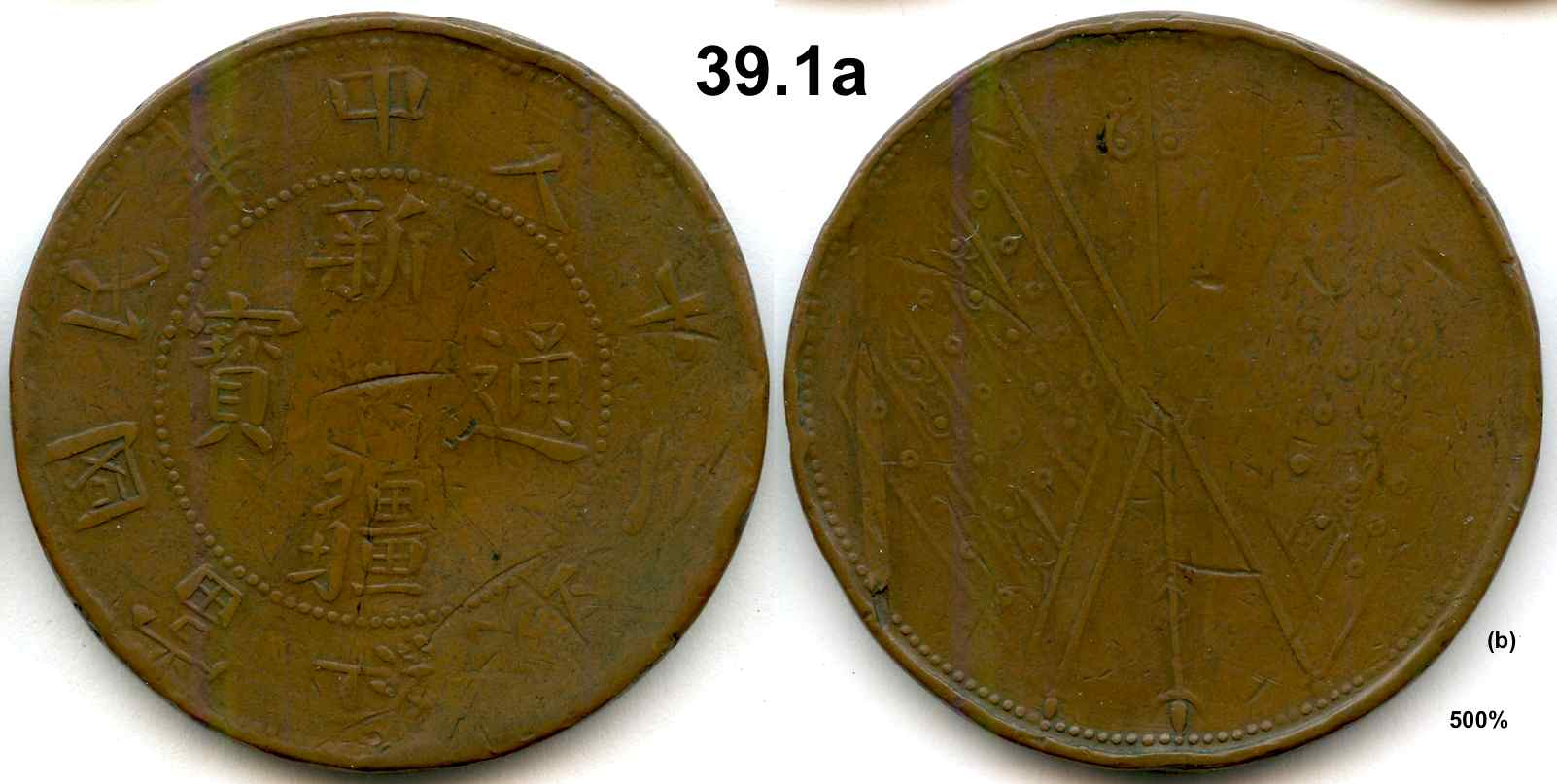
A Xinjiang Tongbao (新疆通寶) of 20 cash produced during the Republic of China.

Machine-struck coins were introduced in the late 19th century and at first were produced alongside the cast coins.

== See also ==
- Silk Road Numismatics
