= Wu Zhu =

Old Chinese coin

- Traditional Chinese: 五銖
- Simplified Chinese: 五铢
- Literal meaning: five zhu
Transcriptions
Standard Mandarin
- Hanyu Pinyin: wǔ zhū
Middle Chinese
- Middle Chinese: /ŋuo^{X} d͡ʑɨo/
Old Chinese
- Zhengzhang: /*ŋaːʔ djo/

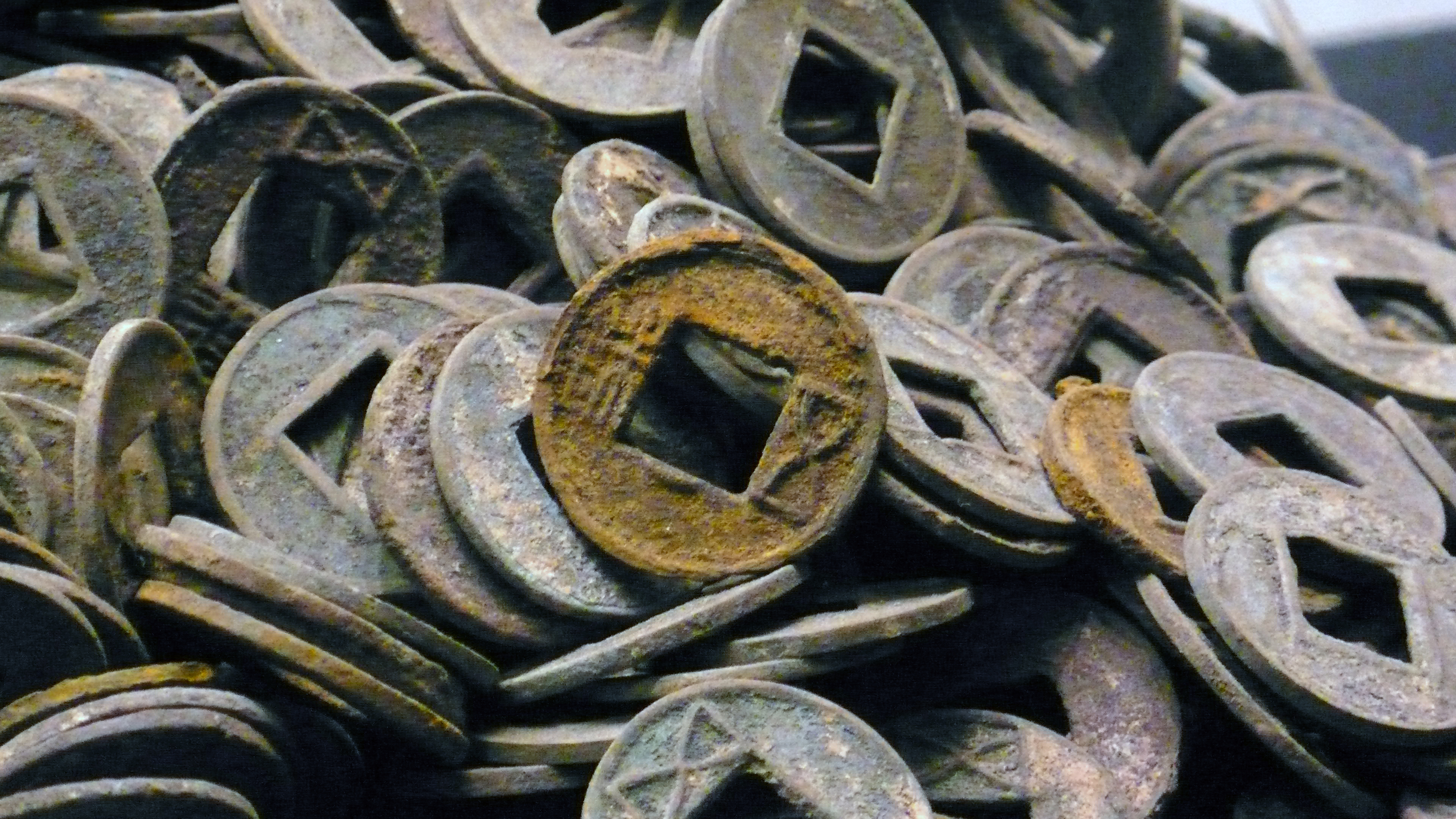
A pile of Wu Zhu (五銖) cash coins.

Wu Zhu (Chinese: 五銖; pinyin: wǔ zhū) is a type of Chinese cash coin produced from the Han dynasty in 118 BC when they replaced the earlier San Zhu ("Three Zhu") cash coins, which had replaced the Ban Liang (半兩) cash coins a year prior, until they themselves were replaced by the Kaiyuan Tongbao (開元通寳) cash coins of the Tang dynasty in 621 AD. The name Wu Zhu literally means "five zhu", with a zhu being a measuring unit officially weighing about 4 grams; however, in reality the weights and sizes of Wu Zhu cash coins varied over the years. During the Han dynasty, a very large quantity of Wu Zhu coins were cast, and their production continued under subsequent dynasties until the Sui.

Wu Zhu cash coins were continuously cast from 118 BC to 618 AD with the exception of an intermission during the Xin dynasty. Minting was discontinued with the establishment of the Tang dynasty. Almost 900 different types and over 1800 varieties of Wu Zhu cash coins and Wu Zhu derivatives are known to exist.

== History ==
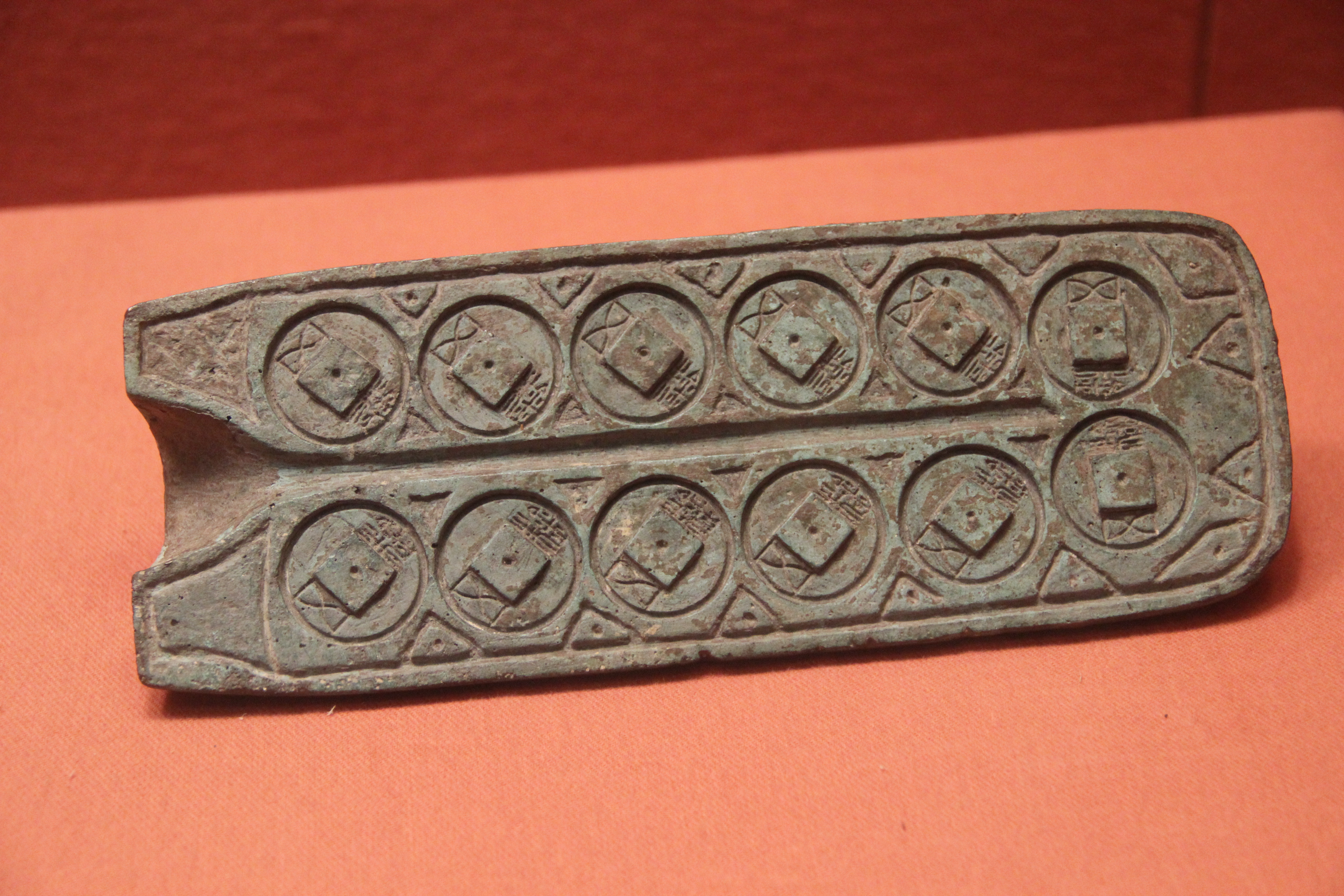
Wuzhu coin mold, Han dynasty

=== Western Han dynasty ===
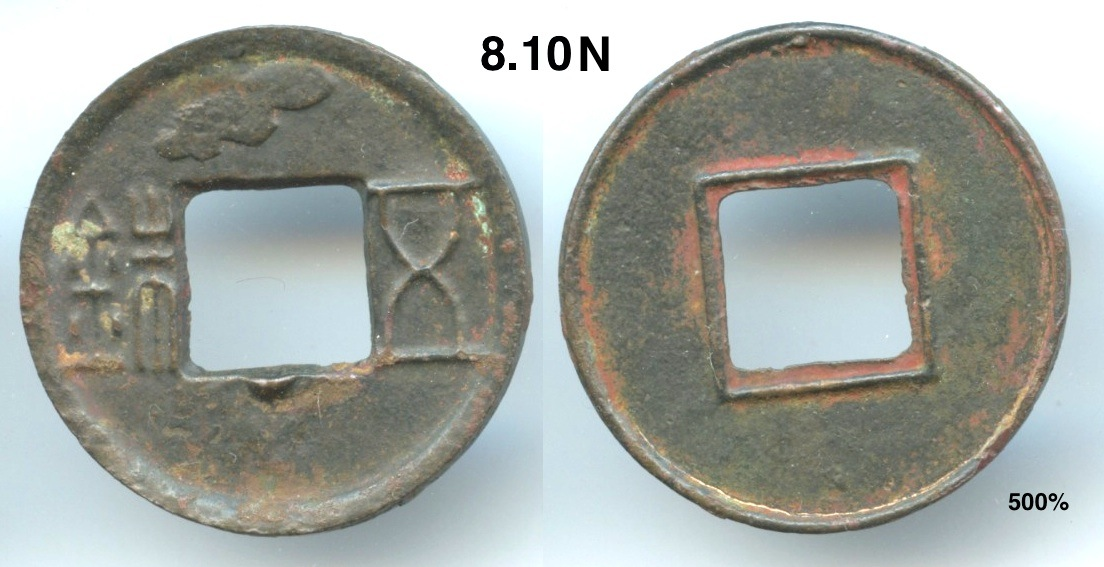
A Wu Zhu (五銖) cash coin issued by the Western Han dynasty.

"Wu" means "five" and zhu was an ancient Chinese unit of weight equal to 100 grains of millet. A "five zhu" cash coin would weigh about 4 grams (1/7 ounce). Originally Ban Liang cash weighed 12 Zhu as a Liang (tael) was 24 Zhu, however over time the weight of Ban Liang cash coins gradually decreased so the Wu Zhu cash coins were introduced as a new standard unit (after the earlier San Zhu, or "3 Zhu" cash coins) under the reign of Emperor Emperor Wu. The introduction of the Wu Zhu also fixed the standard exchange between bronze coins and gold as 10,000 bronze Wu Zhu cash coins would be worth 1 Jin of gold.

The first Wu Zhu cash coins had unfiled edges, but the second series issued under the reign of Emperor Wu were filed. In 118 BC the central government of the Han dynasty ordered both the Commanderies (郡; jùn) and the Principalities (國; guó) to cast Wu Zhu coins, so these Wu Zhu coins are referred to as jùn guó wǔ zhū (郡國五銖) coins which at most have a diameter 33.3 millimetres and a weight of 5.8 grams. A notable feature of Jun Guo Wu Zhu coins is that they have a rim around the square center hole of the reverse side. These rims were added to prevent people from scraping metal off the coins, which would reduce their value. Another notable feature of these early Wu Zhu coins is that they tend to have edges which are unfiled, making these cash coins have rough edges; they are notably also heavier than later cast Wu Zhu coins. In 115 BC Emperor Wu decreed that all Wu Zhu cash coins should be cast with a value of 5 cash coins. These coins are known as chì zè wǔ zhū (赤仄五銖; 'red side Wu Zhu') or zhōng guān chì zè (鍾官赤仄; 'official unit red side') because as they were filed, they gained "red" or "purple" edges that showed as the copper became visible. Another feature of these cash coins is that the "Wu" (五) character tends to be composed of some rather straight lines.

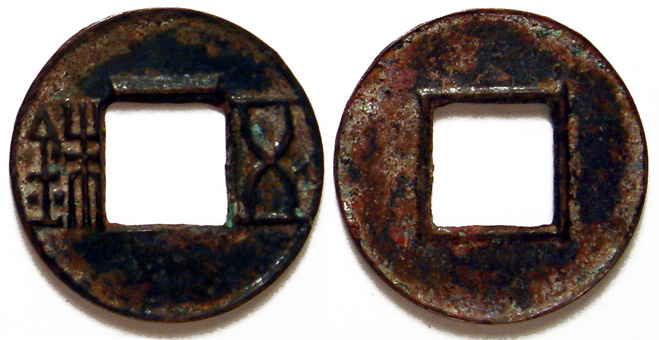
A Wu Zhu (五銖) cash coin made by the Shang Lin San

Starting from the year 113 BC, the central government regained the exclusive authority to manufacture coinage. From this point Wu Zhu cash coins started being produced by the Three Offices of Shang Lin (上林三官; shàng lín sān guān). These Wu Zhu coins had a nominal value of one coin as opposed to the Chi Ze Wu Zhus, which had an unrealistic nominal value of five. The majority of the Shang Lin San Guan Wu Zhus contain a raised line above the square center hole on the obverse side of the coin.

Under the reign of Emperor Xuan, which lasted from 73 BC until 49 BC, the Wu characters were small in size and notably written with slightly crooked strokes that didn't extend to the horizontal lines of the top and bottom ends. A number of these Western Han dynasty Wu Zhu cash coins also displayed dots, which represent "stars", and crescents, which represent the moon, on the interior rim of the coin as well as other symbols which were considered to be auspicious. These became some of the earliest examples of cash coins used as Chinese amulets and charms.

In the 123 years after 118 BCE, when Wu Zhu cash coins were initially introduced, over 28 billion coins were cast for circulation.

=== Xin dynasty ===
After Wang Mang had overthrown the Han dynasty with his own Xin dynasty, he wished to displace the Wu Zhu currency of the Western Han dynasty. This is believed to be part of his prejudice against the "Jin" (Chinese: 金; pinyin: jīn; lit. 'gold') radical (釒) in the character zhū (銖) of this inscription, which was also a component part of the character Liu (劉), the family name of the rulers of the House of Han— whose descendant Wang Mang had just dethroned. He introduced a number of currency reforms which met with varying degrees of success. The first reform, in AD 7, retained the Wu Zhu coin, but reintroduced two versions of knife money. During a later reform the Wu Zhu cash coins were completely abolished, and Wang Mang placed the death penalty on anyone who dared to circulate any Wu Zhu cash coins. However, as the new currency system introduced by Wang Mang was chaotic and confusing, Wu Zhu cash coins kept secretly circulating.

=== Chengjia ===
The Iron Wu Zhus of Chengjia, which resemble the Western Han dynasty Wu Zhu coin, is attributed to Gongsun Shu, who rebelled in Sichuan in AD 25, and issued iron coins, two being equal to one Jian Wu Wu Zhu (Chinese: 建武五銖; pinyin: jiàn wǔ wǔ zhū). These had the head of the zhu component rounded, typical of Eastern Han Wu Zhus. In AD 30, a ditty was sung by the youths of Sichuan: "The yellow bull! the white belly! Let Wu Zhu cash coins return". This ridiculed the tokens of Wang Mang and the iron coins of Gongsun Shu, which were withdrawn by the Eastern Han Emperor Guangwu in the 16th year of Jian Wu (AD 40). The Emperor was advised that the foundation of the wealth of a country depends on a good political economy, which was found in the Wu Zhu coinage, and so reissued the Wu Zhu cash coins.

=== Eastern Han dynasty ===
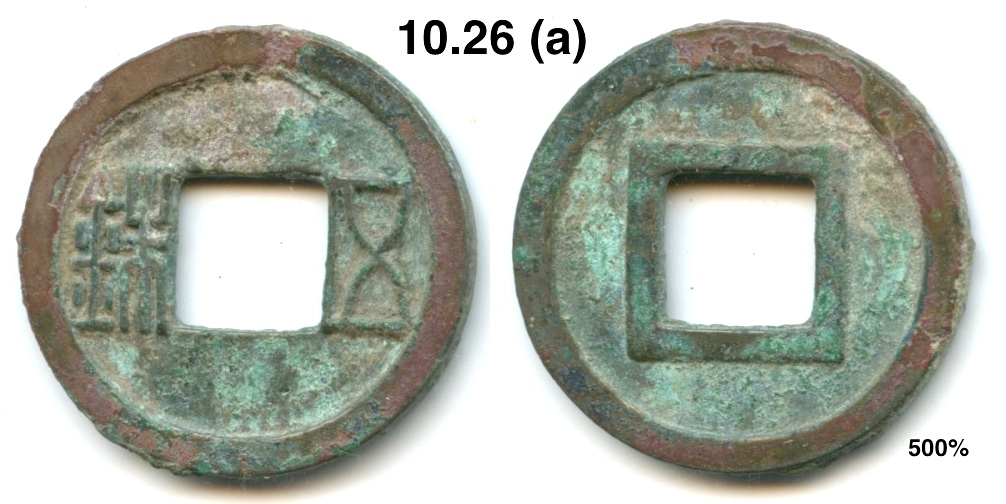
A Wu Zhu (五銖) cash coin from the Eastern Han dynasty.

After the fall of the Xin dynasty, the production of Wu Zhu cash coins was resumed under Emperor Guangwu who reigned from the year 25 until 56 AD. Under the reign of the warlord Dong Zhuo (董卓), the capital of the Han dynasty was moved from Luoyang to the city of Chang'an (modern day Xi'an). There, he ordered that the large Qin dynasty era bronze statues dating back to the reign of Emperor Qin Shi Huang be melted down to make small cash coins. A large quantity of these Wu Zhu coins were so small that they were commonly referred to as "goose eye coins" (鵝眼錢; é yǎn qián) or "chicken eye coins" (雞目錢; jī mù qián) by the people. As these cash coins were so diminutive in size, only left half of the wu (五) Chinese character and the right half of the zhu (銖) Chinese character fit on these coins. It is also pivotal to clarify that these cash coins are not "chiselled rim coins" (鑿邊錢; záo biān qián), where regular-size Wu Zhu cash coins had their insides cut out so as to form two separate cash coins. Goose eye/chicken eye coins were actually cast in this diminutive manner, as evidenced by the remnants of the metal sprue from the casting process on their rim's five o'clock position.

=== The Three Kingdoms ===
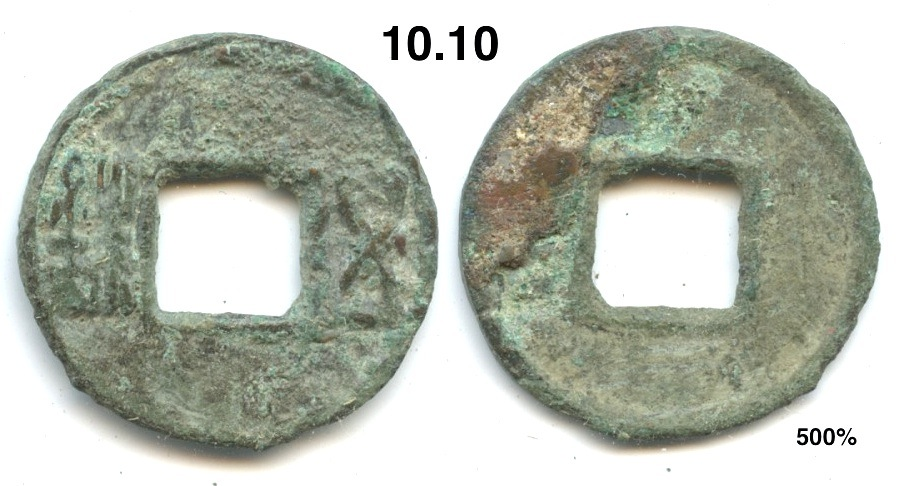
A Wu Zhu (五銖) cash coin issued by the Kingdom of Shu recovered in Sichuan.

The Three Kingdoms period was an era in Chinese history that lasted from 220 until 280 and was characterised by a period of disunity following the collapse of the Eastern Han dynasty. The Kingdom of Shu Han was founded after Liu Bei seized control of the city of Chengdu. Immediately after the city was taken, Liu Bei had discovered that the treasury was completely empty, which meant that he didn't have the funds for his military expenses. This was paired with a severe shortage of copper, this severe lack of copper was so bad that it is said that in order to manufacture cash coins even the hooks which were used to hang bed curtains were melted as the government desperately needed the metal. To cover the state's expenses, Liu Bei ordered the creation of Zhí Bǎi Wǔ Zhū (直百五銖) cash coins which had a nominal value or one hundred regular cash coins. Unlike the earlier coinage of the Xin dynasty, which disastrously failed due to the extreme disparity between the nominal and intrinsic values, the coins of the Kingdom of Shu Han weren't as badly received. These Wu Zhu cash coins produced by Dong Zhuo only weighed around a single gram, previously a cycle plagued Chinese governments trying to set of a fiat coinage system where first the government issued new (fiduciary) cash coins, then the government would set values, usually the people don't accept these set values, and then finally the currency doesn't trade which causes inflation to set in and counterfeiting becomes a prominent problem. Zhi Bai Wu Zhus are usually divided into "thin" and "thick" types depending on the thickness of the cash coin. It is also believed that the Kingdom of Shu Han under the reign of Liu Bei cast a variant of the Wu Zhu cash coin which had a rim around the square hole that is 21.7 millimetres in diameter and has a weight of around 2.3 grams. Due to this association, they are known as the shǔ wǔ zhū (蜀五銖) cash coins, but due to later archeological findings this isn't taken with absolute certainty.

In the Kingdom of Cao Wei which was established by Cao Cao in 220 it is believed that only Wu Zhu coins were cast. Moulds have been found dating to this period and it is confirmed that Wu Zhu cash coins were cast from the first year of the Taihe period (227) until the second year of Xianxi period (265).

=== Jin dynasty and the 16 Kingdoms ===
Under Sima Yan, China was reunited for a short period of time under the rule of the Western Jin dynasty ruled from Luoyang. The Chinese economy improved under Jin rule, and although no historical records mention the production of coinage under the Jin, since the quantity of old Wu Zhu cash coins that were still in circulation would not have been sufficient, it is likely that the government would've had to cast a large number of cash coins in order to need the demand coming from the market. The Great Dictionary of Chinese Numismatics claims that Wu Zhu cash coins were being cast in the city of Chengdu in the Shu region of the Western Jin dynasty (which lies in modern-day Sichuan). After a family struggle within the Sima family caused a devastating civil war, China was so weakened that the "five barbarian tribes" from the north started conquering territories in China and established their own states starting the sixteen kingdoms period.

==== Former Liang Kingdom ====
The Kingdom of Former Liang started casting Wu Zhu cash coins, which have traditionally been attributed to the Kingdom of Shu known as "Shu Wu Zhu" cash coins. Some of these Wu Zhus have been discovered in the Hexi Corridor (in current day Gansu province), which lead archaeologists to believe that they may have been cast under the reign of Zhang Gui.

=== The Northern and Southern dynasties ===
After the Eastern Jin dynasty fell, the Northern and Southern dynasties period began in the year 420. In the Southern dynasties, it was customary for people to remove the middle part of Wu Zhu cash coins to create two separate coins. The portion cut out of the outer ring of the Wu Zhu is usually referred to as a "thread ring Wu Zhu" (綖環五銖; xiàn huán wǔ zhū), while the coin cut out of the inner portion is usually referred to as "chiseled rim Wu Zhu" (鑿邊五銖; záo biān wǔ zhū) cash coins or as "cut rim Wu Zhu" (剪輪五銖; jiǎn lún wǔ zhū) cash coins. Private casting of cash coins also became a common practice during the Northern and Southern dynasties period, which resulted in there being many extremely small, thin, and very fragile bronze cash coins that were cast by these private mints. These cash coins are known as "goose eye" (鵝眼; é yǎn) or "chicken eye" (雞目; jī mù) coins. Peng Xinwei mentions a man called Gu Xuan of the Liang dynasty that was one of the first to write about Chinese numismatics. Gu Xuan wrote about the circulating cash coins of the period, but did not mention any Qi dynasty cash coins. Peng takes this as evidence that the Qi dynasty did not mint any of its own cash coins. The cash coins of this period were of a high artistic standard, especially those produced by the Chen and the Zhou dynasties.

All cash coins of this period typically have a narrow rim. However, during this period private minting was way more common in the Southern dynasties than in the Northern dynasties, which is the reason that Wu Zhu cash coins and other coins of the Southern dynasties were more uneven than those of the Northern dynasties.

All the coins of the period had the same kind of seal script calligraphy.

==== Liang dynasty ====
Under the reign of Emperor Wu of the Liang dynasty, there were two types of Wu Zhu cash coins which were being manufactured. Some had an outside rim while others did not. The Wu Zhu cash coins without an outside rim are referred to as "Female coins" (女錢; nǚ qián). (Note: These are alternately referred to as simplified Chinese: 公式女钱; traditional Chinese: 公式女錢; pinyin: Gōngshì nǚ qián.)

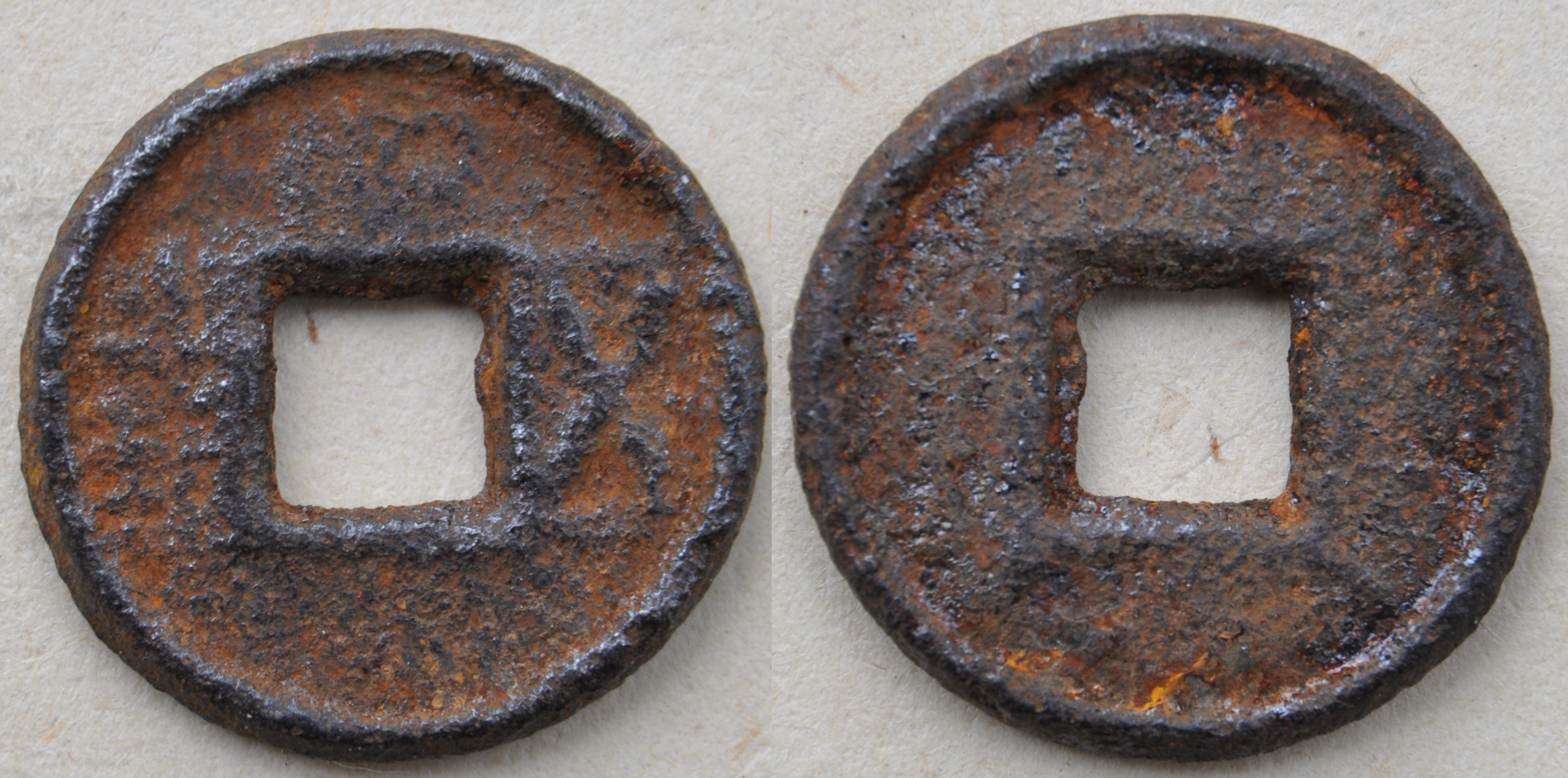
A Liang dynasty era iron Wu Zhu (五銖) cash coin.

From the year 523 onwards, the government of the Liang dynasty decided to cast iron Wu Zhu cash coins, since iron was both relatively easy to use and not expensive to acquire in what is today Sichuan. The iron cash coins issued by the Liang dynasty are quite distinctive from other iron cash coins, as they have 4 lines that radiate outwards from each corner of the square center hole, giving them the name "four corner coins" (四出錢; sì chū qián). As it became quite common for people to cast iron cash coins privately, it wasn't long before their quantities increased so drastically that it required cartloads of these iron Wu Zhu cash coins to pay for anything. To this day these Wu Zhus are quite common due to the widespread private production that plagued these iron issues. After them the Taiqing Fengle (太清豐樂; "Tai Qing Prosperous and Happy") cash coin was cast under the reign of Emperor Wu. These cash coins were actually believed to be Chinese numismatic charms until recently and were named after the Taiqing period (547–549).

In 552 under the reign of Emperor Yuan the capital city was moved to the city of Jiangling. The Jiangling Mint issued Wu Zhu cash coins which had two "stars" (a term used to refer to dots on cash coins) on the obverse of the Wu Zhu. One "star" was situated above the square center hole, and one below and for this reason are commonly known as "Two Pillar Wu Zhu cash coins" (兩柱五銖錢; liǎng zhù wǔ zhū qián). These Wu Zhus were nominally worth ten normal Wu Zhus and are relatively rare today.

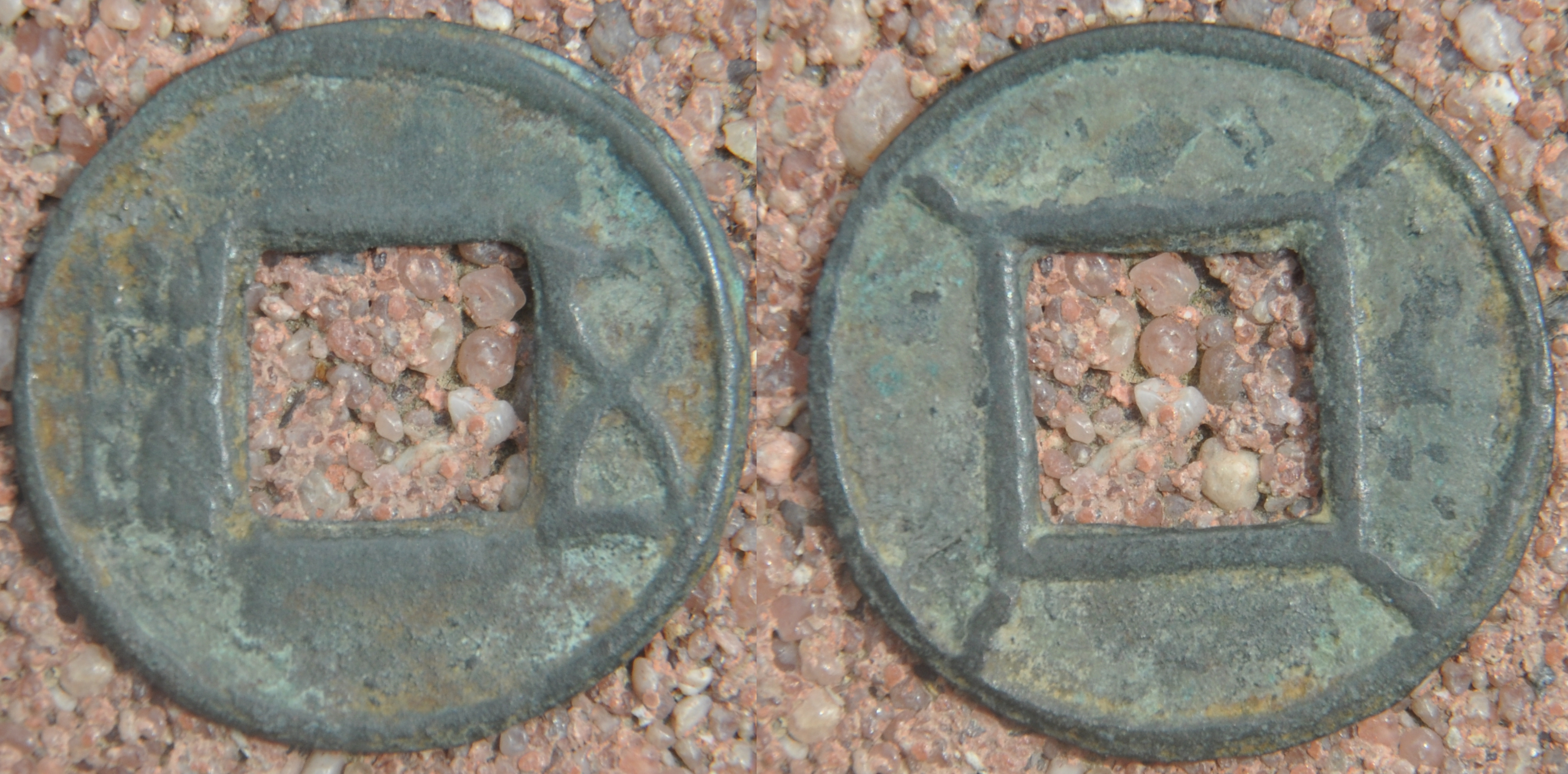
Four Pillar Wu Zhu coin

From the year 557, under the reign of Emperor Jing had Wu Zhu cash coins produced that had one "star" above the square hole and one "star" below on both sides of these Wu Zhus. They are known as "Four Pillar Wu Zhu cash coins" (四柱五銖錢; sì zhù wǔ zhū qián) and had a nominal value of 20 normal Wu Zhu cash coins, but merely 10 days after their introduction they were trading at par with regular Wu Zhus. Another variant of these "Four Pillar Wu Zhu cash coins" had the "stars" on the left and right sides of the square center hole. Today "Four Pillar Wu Zhu cash coins" are extremely rare, with those that have the "stars" above and below the square center hole being the rarest.

Another variant of Liang dynasty era Wu Zhus known as the "Three Pillar Wu Zhu cash coins" (三柱五銖錢; sān zhù wǔ zhū qián) were produced, however as no historical records mention them it is exactly unknown when they were produced, it is speculated by some Chinese numismatists and Gary Ashkenazy that they were only produced for five days in the year 557 immediately after the production of the "Four Pillar Wu Zhu cash coins" to circulate at a value of 10 normal Wu Zhus and had three "stars" to differentiate them from the earlier "Two Pillar Wu Zhu cash coins" which had the same exaggerated nominal value. "Three Pillar Wu Zhu cash coins" have one "star" above and one "star" below the obverse square hole, while they have one "star" just to the left and touching the rim that surrounds the square center hole on the reverse side of the coin. These cash coins are extremely rare today due to their extremely short production period.

Note that despite their high nominal values, "Two Pillar", "Three Pillar", and "Four Pillar" Wu Zhu cash coins usually weighed less than 2 or 3 grams, this disparity between their nominal and intrinsic values was a contributing factor to the decline of the economy of the Liang dynasty.

==== Chen dynasty ====
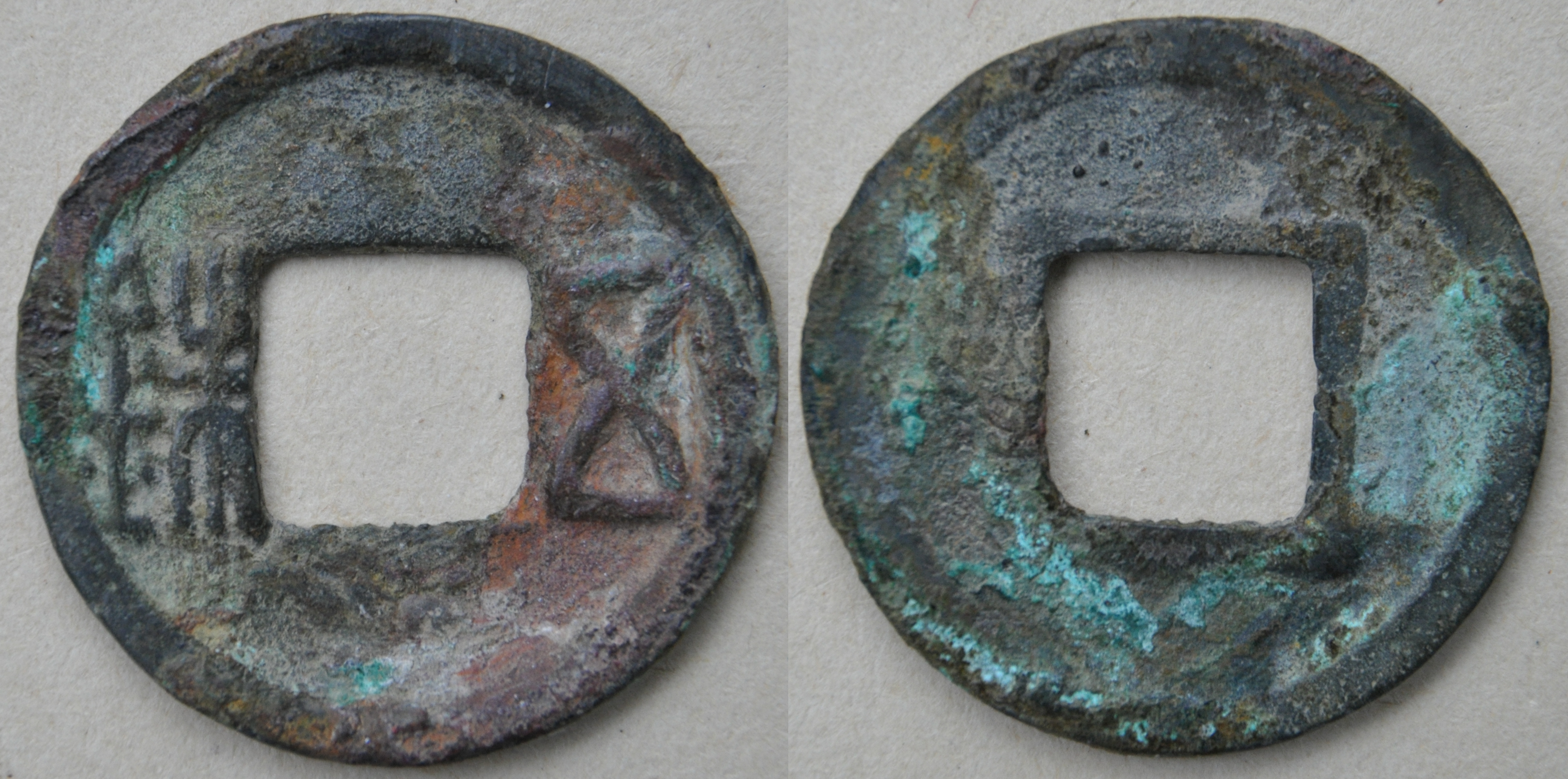
A Chen dynasty era Wu Zhu (五銖) cash coin.

The Chen dynasty produced Wu Zhu cash coins which had a nominal value of 10 "Goose Eye Wu Zhus" and/or "Chicken Eye Wu Zhus" and were known as "Tianjia Wu Zhu cash coins" (天嘉五銖錢; tiān jiā wǔ zhū qián) because they were produced during the Tianjia period of Emperor Wen. However, as not a single specimen exists today, it is unknown what these Tianjia era Wu Zhu coins looked like. It is speculated that these Tianjia era Wu Zhu coins would have been relatively big and had a rim around the square center hole on the obverse side of the coin being overall similar to the Taihuo Liuzhu (太貨六銖; tài huò liù zhū) cash coins. Wu Zhu cash coins that fit this description historically have been believed to have been produced during the Tianjian era (502–519) in the Liang dynasty under the reign of Emperor Wu. As Wu Zhu cash coins also fitting this description have been dug up in Guanzhong, Shaanxi it has been proposed that they might've been produced by the Northern Zhou dynasty.

Under the reign of Emperor Xuan in 579 the Taihuo Liuzhu (太貨六銖; tài huò liù zhū) cash coins were cast which originally had a nominal value of 10 Wu Zhu coins, but its nominal value was decreased to be equal to the Wu Zhu. Taihuo Liuzhu cash coins are considered to be the "crown jewel" of Southern dynasty coinage due to the quality of its calligraphy. As the seal script version of the Hanzi character for "six" (六; liù) looked similar to a human being standing akimbo, which inspired the contemporary saying that this symbolised the general people standing in this position before the Emperor and exclaiming that the nominal value of the Taihuo Liuzhu was too high. An extremely rare version of this cash coin exists that only has the inscription Liu Zhu (六銖; liù zhū); this coin is in fact so rare that only a single specimen of it has ever been reported to exist.

==== Northern Wei dynasty ====
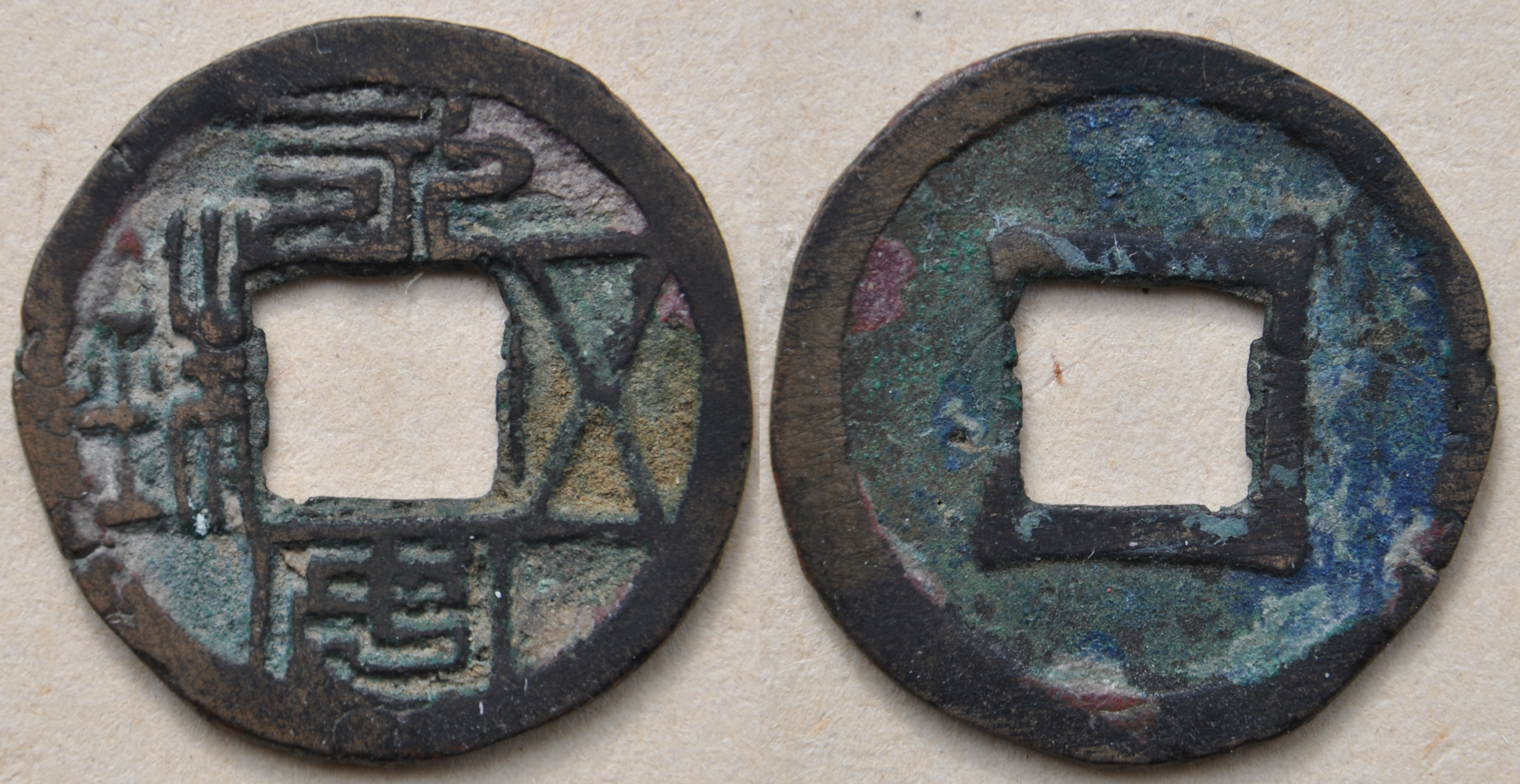
A Yongan Wuzhu (永安五銖) cash coin issued by the Northern Wei dynasty.

The Northern Wei dynasty was a Xianbei ruled state under the Tuoba clan that adopted the administrative system of the Han Chinese and even established their capital city at Luoyang, a city which had been the capital city of various preceding Chinese dynasties and mandated that his people adopt both Chinese fashion and language. During this period Emperor Xiaowen ordered the issuance of the Taihe Wuzhu (太和五銖; tài hé wǔ zhū) as part of this Sinicisation process. There is one purported version of the Taihe Wuzhu which has the Chinese character "Tai" (太) written in a calligraphic style akin to that of the "Tai" on the Taihuo Liuzhu (太貨六銖; tài huò liù zhū) cash coin issued by the Chen dynasty. However, as the only evidence relating to the existence of this cash coin comes from rubbings in old coin catalogues, it is speculated that it might not have been real. Taihe Wuzhu coins tend to be fairly crudely made and vary in size and weight. Larger specimens are typically about 2.5 centimeters in diameter and weigh about 3 grams. Smaller Taihe Wuzhu specimens are typically about 2 centimeters in diameter and weigh 2.3 grams. The calligraphy found on its inscription is a mixture of both Chinese seal script and clerical script, which comprises the classic Wei stelae style (魏碑体). The Taihe Wuzhu cash coins only circulated in the areas around Luoyang and never became the national currency for the entire Northern Wei dynasty as a whole leading to them becoming relatively scarce.

The Northern Wei dynasty started issuing regular Wu Zhu (五銖) cash coins in 510 but it is currently unknown what special characteristics these Wu Zhu cash coins had to differentiate them from other Wu Zhus.

Emperor Xiaozhuang ordered the creation of the Yongan Wuzhu in the year 529 which was during the Yongan period (528–530), despite the fact that the authoritative power government of the Northern Wei dynasty was in trouble as the rebellion of the Six Frontier Towns waged on for a decade. After Emperor Xiaowu was forced to flee from Luoyang in the year 534 the country split into the Western Wei dynasty and the Eastern Wei dynasty, and despite the fact that neither country existed for a long period of time they both continued issuing Yongan Wuzhu cash coins to the point that both large quantities and a large number of varieties exist, as well as the fact that Yongan Wuzhu cash coins are still extremely common today.

During this era various nicknames for cash coins were given by the people which include the "Auspicious cash coins" (吉錢; jí qián) as well as the "Heavenly Pillar" (天株) cash coins, it is unknown what these cash coins were but it's speculated by Gary Ashkenazy that they were variants of the Yongan Wuzhu cash coins, according to Gary Ashkenazy the "Auspicious cash coins" were very likely to have been Yongan Wuzhu's that had the Hanzi character for "earth" (土) on the reverse side of the coin above the square center hole. The nickname would then be derived from the fact that the square center hole resembles the Hanzi character "口" and as the "土" would be above it they together would look like "吉" meaning "auspicious". According to Gary Ashkenazy the "Heavenly Pillar" cash coin may have also been a variety of the Yongan Wuzhu which has a "dot" (representing "stars" 星) in the lower right part of the obverse side of the coin. When the "Heavenly Pillar" cash coin is held upright it would point towards the sky or "heaven" (天). The "star" in this particular case can also be referred to as a "pillar" (株) because it is cylindrically shaped and appears to rise up from the surface (肉) of the Yongan Wuzhu cash coin. Another variant of the Yongan Wuzhu is also known as the "four corner" (si chu 四出) cash coin because it has 4 diagonal lines thar extend outwards from the corners of the square center hole all the way to the reverse rim of these Yongan Wuzhu coins.

There were other cash coins in this era which also had descriptive nicknames assigned to them such as "Yongzhou Green-Red" (雍州青赤; yōng zhōu qīng chì), "Liangzhou Born Thick" (梁州生厚; liáng zhōu shēng hòu), "Tight Cash" (緊錢; jǐn qián), and "Red Halter" (赤牽; chì qiān). These cash coins were mentioned in historical records and may have also been references to specific varieties of Yongan Wuzhu cash coins which currently aren't clearly identified yet.

==== Western Wei dynasty ====
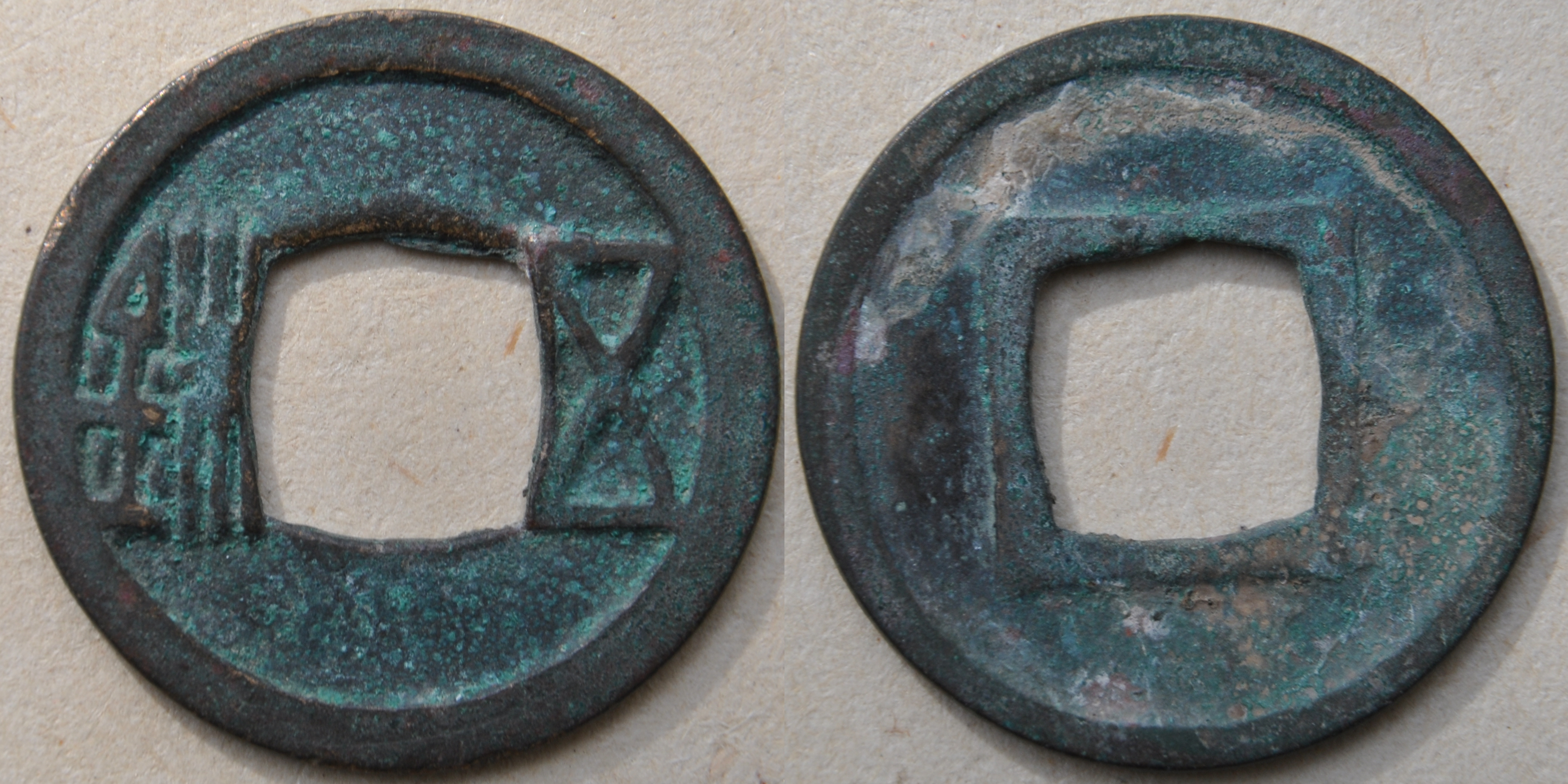
A Wu Zhu cash coin issued under Emperor Wen.

The Western Wei dynasty existed briefly from the year 535 until 556, historical records mention that a Wu Zhu cash coin was cast during the Datong period (535–551) which had a calligraphic style akin to that of the earlier Yongan Wuzhu cash coins as well as those of the Sui Wu Zhus. A defining characteristic of these "Datong Wu Zhu cash coins" (大統五銖錢; dà tǒng wǔ zhū qián) is the fact that they have a broad outer rim with an inner rim only by the "Wu" (五) character to the right side of the square center hole.

==== Northern Qi dynasty ====
The Northern Qi dynasty was a country founded by Emperor Wenxuan that existed from the year 550 until 577, from the year 553 the Changping Wuzhu (常平五銖; chángpíng wǔ zhū) cash coins were cast.

=== Sui dynasty ===
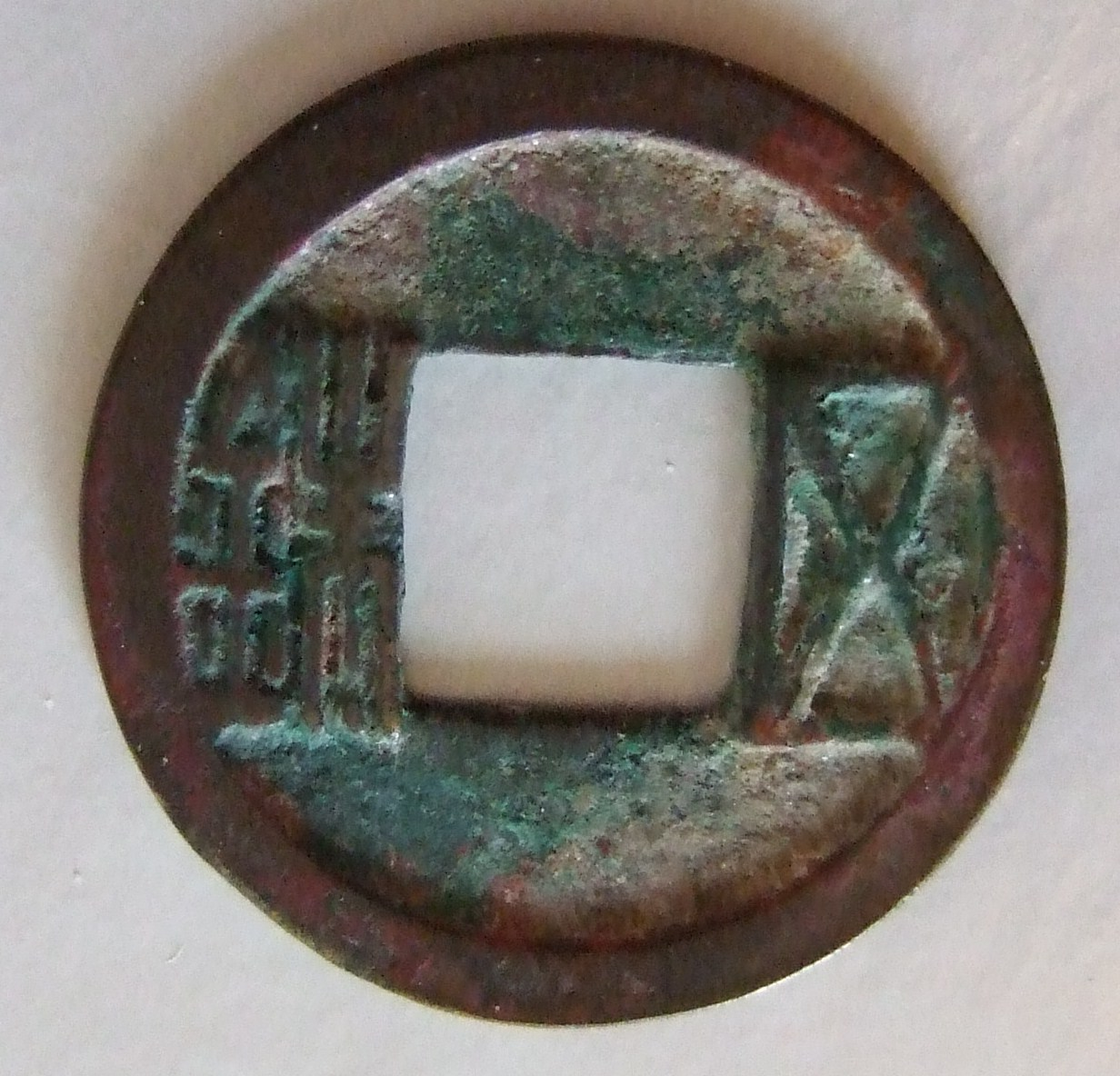
A Wu Zhu (五銖) cash coin produced under the reign of Emperor Wen.

China was reunified under the Sui dynasty (581–618). Under this short-lived dynasty, many reforms were initiated that led to the subsequent success of the Tang dynasty. The only coin associated with the Sui is a Wu Zhu coin. The Sui dynasty only cast one type of coin, a Wu Zhu with wide rim that has been found in excavations that clearly indicated that it belonged to the Sui period. Chinese numismatic researcher Peng Xinwei believed that the Sui dynasty period Wu Zhu was adopted from the Western Wei, because it is said in the history of the Sui, that Wu Zhus already circulated in the first year of the Sui, and that additional new cash coins were minted at the same time.

Emperor Wen decreed that Wu Zhu cash coins be produced in the first year of the Kaihuang period (581 in the Gregorian calendar), alongside the introduction of this new Wu Zhu cash coin the older currencies were gradually being deprecated and with the conquest of the Chen dynasty the coins now known as "Sui Wu Zhu cash coins" (隋五銖錢; suí wǔ zhū qián) were the only circulating currency in all of China. The reason why Emperor Wen introduced a new Wu Zhu was because the fiduciary cash coins of the Northern Zhou and Chen dynasties placed the economy in a bad state and the Sui Wu Zhus were set to the original weight of 2 grams. The first Wu Zhus are known as the "Kaihuang Wu Zhu cash coins" (開皇五銖; kāi huáng wǔ zhū) because of their year of introduction, later Emperor Wen allowed the principalities of the Sui dynasty to cast their own Wu Zhus. Additional mints were set up in various prefectures, typically with five furnaces each. Cash was frequently checked for quality by the officials. However, after 605, private coining again caused a deterioration of the coinage. Today these Wu Zhu cash coins are still very common and must have likely been manufactured in immense numbers. The fabric of the Wu Zhus of the Sui dynasty is unlike that of any earlier Chinese cash coins but resemble that of the vast majority of later produced Chinese coins. The rims of these Wu Zhus tend to be broad and flat, while earlier Chinese cash coins usually have thin and rather rounded rims. The basic fabric of a coin is dictated by the minting techniques used to produce it and the Wu Zhus of the Sui dynasty were produced with an entirely new casting technology.

Among the varieties of the Sui dynasty era Wu Zhu is one which is particularly well-made composed of what the Chinese call "white copper" (白銅; bái tóng) and are therefore known as "Bai Qian Wu Zhu" (白錢五銖; bái qián wǔ zhū) cash coins and are believed to have been manufactured in the Jiangnan region. The Chinese character "Wu" (五) on these coins is slightly more curved where the lines cross. Wu Zhu cash coins from the Sui dynasty are known to be produced in both larger and smaller sizes, the smaller and lighter Wu Zhus were produced later as the country was facing higher expenditures and debased the coinage, the last Wu Zhu cash coins of the Sui dynasty circulated alongside improvised currency such as scraps of iron, paper, and leather.

== Kingdom of Kucha ==
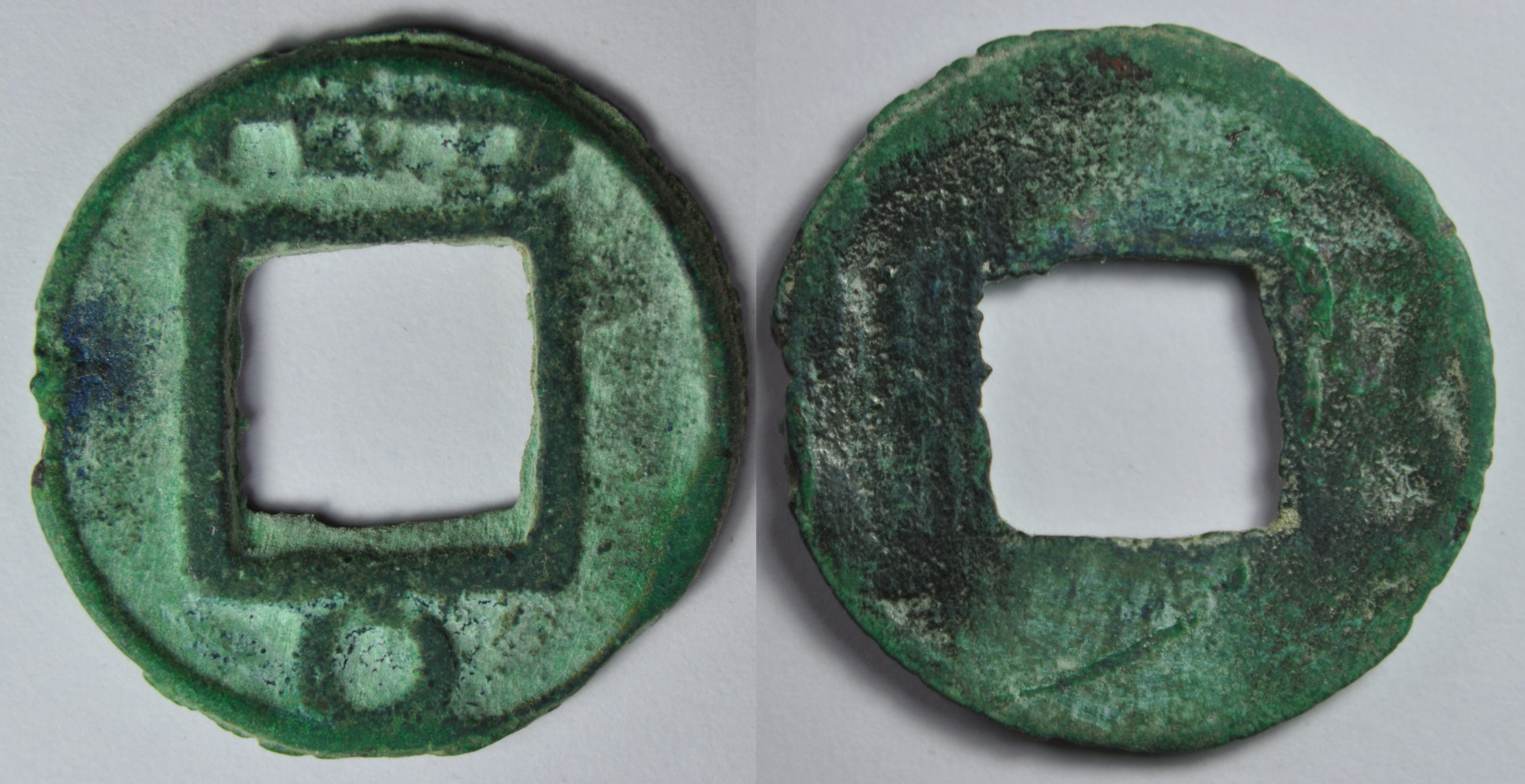
A "Han Gui bilingual Wu Zhu coin" (漢龜二體五銖錢) produced by the Kingdom of Kucha with both a Chinese and a Kuśiññe inscription.

The Kingdom of Kucha was a Buddhist state located in present-day Kucha County, Xinjiang. It was first recorded during the Han dynasty and was later annexed by the Tang. During its time it was a prominent player on the silk road. From around the third or fourth century, the Kingdom of Kucha began the manufacture of Wu Zhu cash coins, inspired by the diminutive and devalued Wu Zhus of the post-Han dynasty era in Chinese history.

There are five known types of Kucha cash coins based on the Chinese Wu Zhus which are usually characterised by the fact that they're diminutive in size, very thin, and tend to have both weak and irregular inscriptions while four of these types tend to have no inscriptions at all. One type of Kucha Wu Zhu cash coin is the "Han Gui bilingual Wu Zhu coin" (漢龜二體五銖錢; hàn guī èr tǐ wǔ zhū qián) which are characterised by the fact that the obverse side resembles Chinese Wu Zhu coins while the reverse sides feature a local Kucha script above and below the square center hole. As the language of the Kingdom of Kucha isn't well preserved in the modern era many hypotheses have been suggested about its meaning including that it is simply a translation of "Wu Zhu" or feature the name of the Kingdom of Kucha in the Kuśiññe language. Cash coins without any inscription cast in this region are generally believed to have been produced between the years 265 and 589, the first variant of these cash coins are round in shape and have a rim around the square centre hole on one side while the other side is rimless, they tend to thin on the outside while they're thick on the inside and weigh between 0.4 grams 1.7 grams, and have a diameter of 9 to 18 millimetres. The second type can be described as similar to the aforementioned type but have no inner rim, these cash coins generally from 8 to 13 millimetres in diameter and have a weight of 0.2 to 0.4 grams. The third type of these cash coins are also completely without rim but are square in shape and have a square centre hole, they tend to be very thin with diameters between 8 and 11 millimetres and weigh between 0.2 and 0.5 grams. The final variant are irregularly shaped, diminutive in size, thin, and are cast of poor workmanship. Some are merely five millimetres in diameter and weigh as little as 0.2 grams.

The Buddhist monk Xuanzang describes that there are "small bronze coins" in the city of Kucha while he visited there in the year 630 which is mentioned in his work "Great Tang Records on the Western Regions" during the Tang dynasty. These cash coins are likely to have been the "Han Gui bilingual Wu Zhu coin".

== Wu Zhu coins and the emergence of Chinese charms ==
Wu Zhu cash coins played a central role in the emergence of Chinese numismatic charms, as the Wu Zhu cash coins were cast in enormous quantities during both the Western Han dynasty and the subsequent seven hundred years of its usage not all variants can be directly attributed to every ruler, however "auspicious" symbols such as stars (dots), suns (circles), moons (crescents), numbers, rod numerals, Hanzi characters, lines, and others started to be used after the Eastern Han dynasty, the reason for the earlier uniformity was the usage of bronze moulds which last for a long time, these moulds continued to be used over and over again by subsequent dynasties. However, as other techniques such as mother coins started to be used some mints started adding these "auspicious" symbols which became the inspiration for later Chinese charms and amulets. Although the usage of some these symbols were already used on the earlier Ban Liang cash coins, they became more common on the Wu Zhu. It unclear why exactly these symbols started being added in large quantities during the Eastern Han dynasty and later but the first Chinese charms and amulets started emulating their design. Some of these early Wu Zhu coins also had the precursors to the "flower" or "rosette" holes found on later cash coins as such coins were discussed in an article in the 1987 (7th issue) of the Chinese periodical "Shaanxi Finance" (陝西金融; shǎn xī jīn róng) which shows rubbings of several Wu Zhu cash coins with unusual center holes found in a hoard.

=== Wu Zhu charms ===
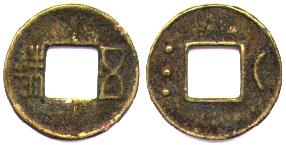
A later reproduction of a Wu Zhu cash coin to serve as a Chinese "good luck" charm or "lucky coin".

Chinese numismatic charms based on Wu Zhu cash coins tend to feature the same "auspicious symbolism" as contemporary Wu Zhu cash coins had themselves including crescents representing the moon, circles representing the sun, and dots representing the stars, in fact to an untrained eye Wu Zhu charms can be interchangeable with regular Wu Zhu coins. Other than these features it's also not uncommon for Wu Zhu charms to feature wholly original iconography from various aspects of Chinese culture such as a dragon and a fisherman. Other than simply having the inscription "Wu Zhu" some Wu Zhu charms are also based on other variants of the Wu Zhu cash coins with four character inscriptions that incorporate the legend "Wu Zhu".

Wu Zhu cash coins are sometimes Integrated into other types of charms and amulets, as there is a variant Daruma doll which features Bodhidharma, the founder of Zen Buddhism, holding a Northern Wei dynasty period Taihe Wuzhu cash coin.

== Wu Zhu coin moulds (gallery) ==
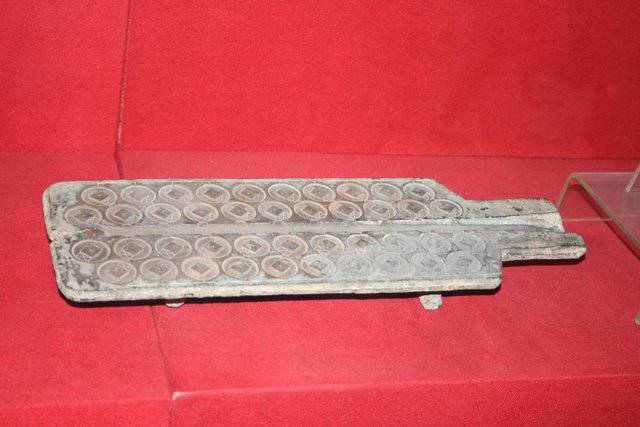
Photograph by Professor Gary Lee Todd (Professor of History, SIAS International University, Xinzheng, Henan, China)

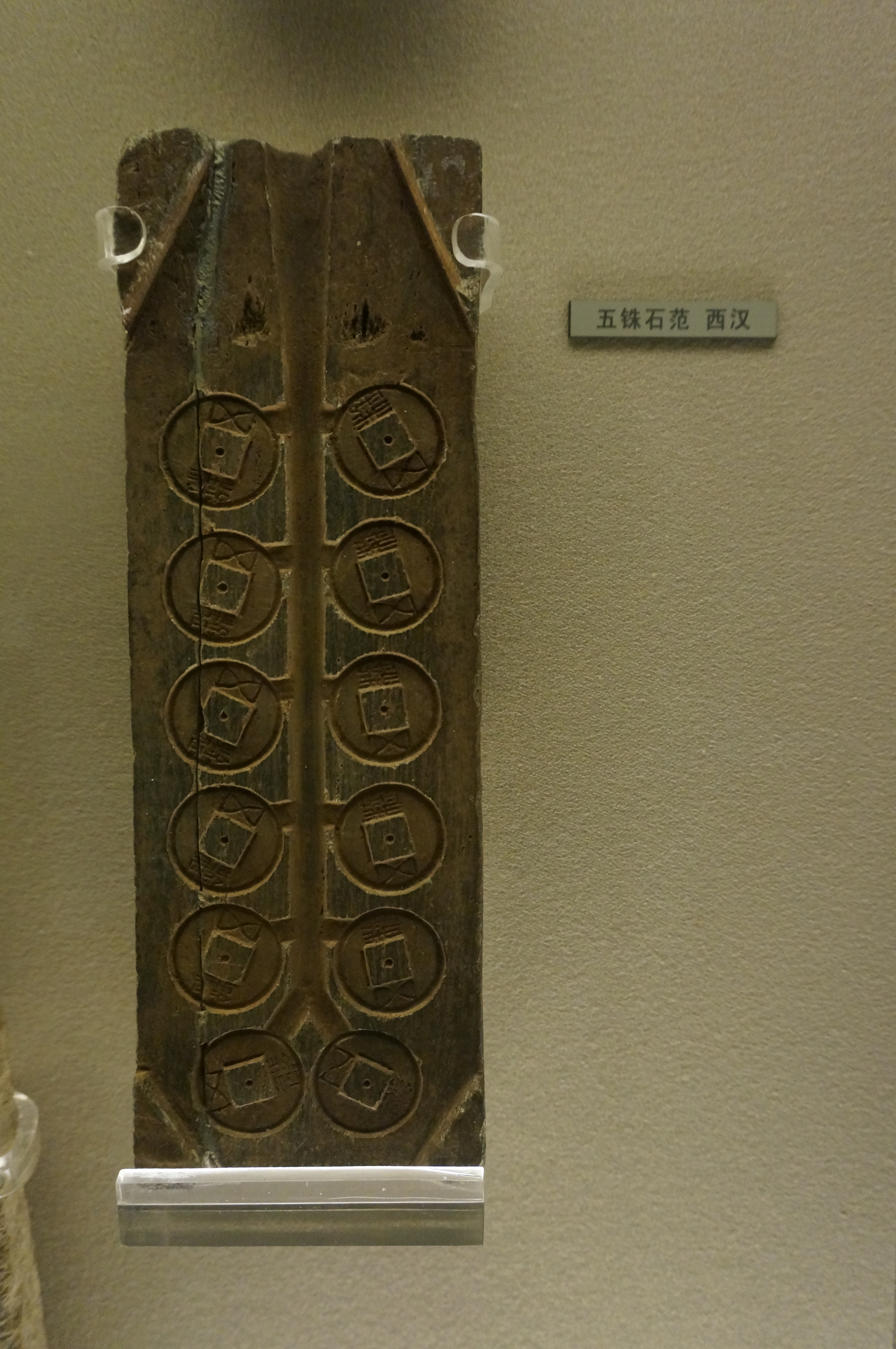
Shanghai Museum.

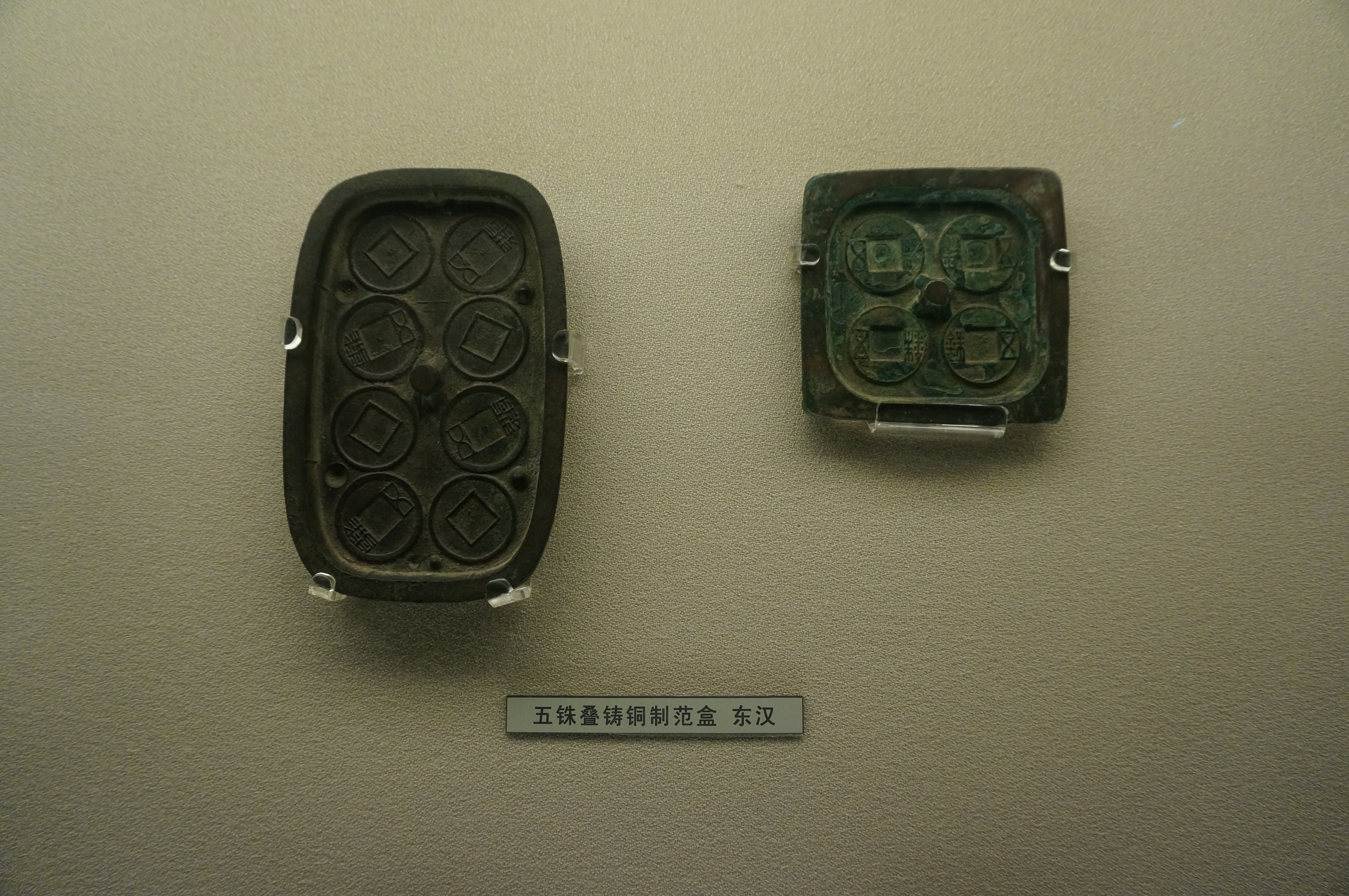
Shanghai Museum.

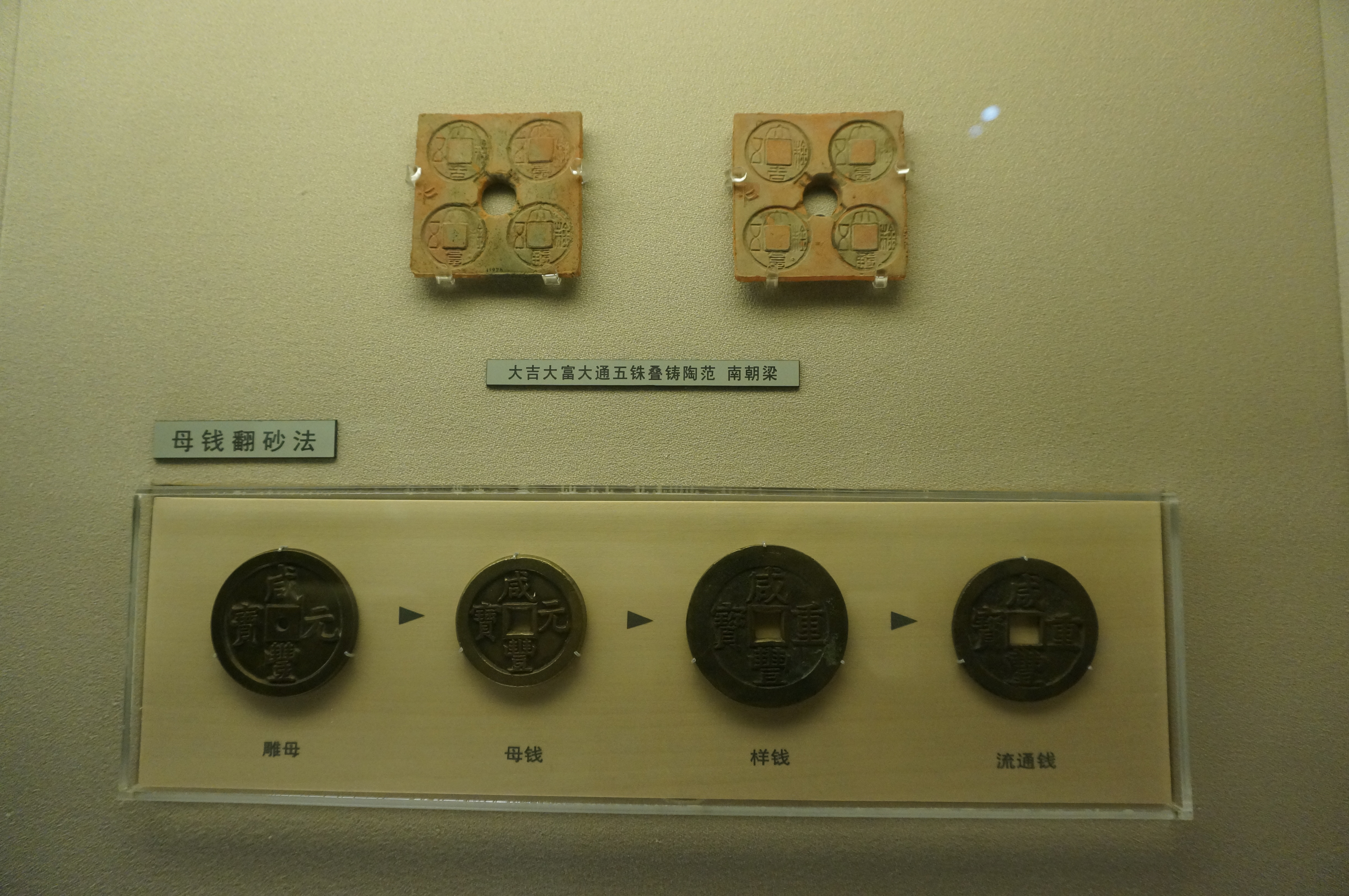
Shanghai Museum.

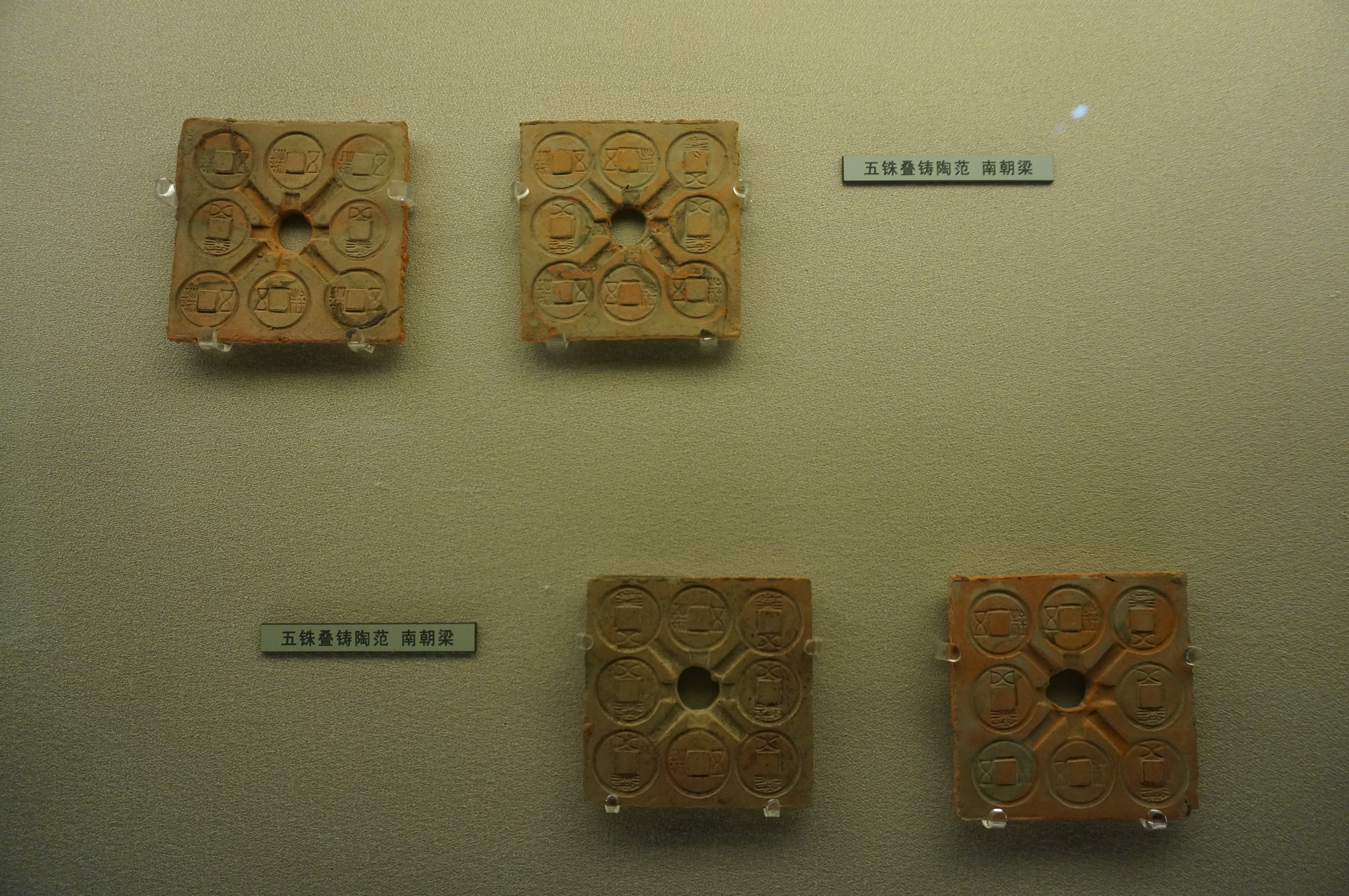
Shanghai Museum.

== Hoards of Wu Zhu cash coins ==
In the modern era hoards of Wu Zhu cash coins tend to be very common in China as these coins were produced in large quantities.

- In 1980, a golden Wu Zhu cash coin was unearthed in the prefecture-level city of Xianyang in province of Shaanxi. This golden cash coin is 2.6 cm in diameter and was cast during the Western Han dynasty period.
- In 2000 at the archeological site of So Kwun Wat, Tuen Mun in the special administrative region of Hong Kong over sixty Han dynasty era bronze cash coins were unearthed which included both Ban Liang (半兩) and Wu Zhu (五銖) cash coins, among the hoard were also pieces of linen and bamboo mats.
- In January 2006 during the construction of a plaza in Pingli County, Shaanxi a Han dynasty era tomb was uncovered, during its excavation archeologists found 259 Wu Zhu cash coins, 1 tripod made from iron, a pottery kitchen range as well as 3 pottery urns.
- On 16 July 2012 a large cache of 14,000 ancient Chinese coins was found in Kuqa, Xinjiang which included Han dynasty era Wu Zhu (五銖) and "Chiseled rim Wu Zhu" (鑿邊五銖) cash coins, Xin dynasty era Huo Quan (貨泉) and Daquan Wushi (大泉五十) cash coins, a Three Kingdoms period Taiping Baiqian (太平百錢) cash coins, as well as native cash coins. Alongside the cash coins were shards of pottery as well as fragments of human bones which lead the archeologists believe that this was an old cemetery.
- In August 2012 a large hoard of Wu Zhu cash coins and Xin dynasty era cash coins was found in the city of Huoluochaideng, Inner Mongolia. The hoard included 3500 kg of Chinese cash coins and around 150 clay moulds used to manufacture coins from the Xin dynasty. According to archeologists the site might've been a mint that was in operation since the reign of Emperor Wu until Emperor Wang Mang.
- In 2015 Chinese archeologists uncovered 10 tonnes of bronze Wu Zhu cash coins from the Western Han dynasty (or around 2 million coins) alongside over ten thousand of other iron, bronze, and gold items in the Haihunhou cemetery near Nanchang, Jiangxi, among the other uncovered items were bamboo slips, wood tablets, as well as jade objects. As these Wu Zhu cash coins were strung in strings of 1000 pieces this proved that the practice of stringing cash coins per 1000 didn't first happen during the Tang dynasty as was previously thought but actually six hundred years earlier.
- In 2018 in South Korea 26 Wu Zhu cash coins were unearthed in a tomb in Kyongsan, North Gyeongsang.

== See also ==
- Silk Road numismatics

== Sources ==
- Hartill, David (2005). Cast Chinese Coins: A Historical Catalogue. Trafford. ISBN 978-1-4120-5466-9.
