= Kucha coinage =

Ancient Chinese coins

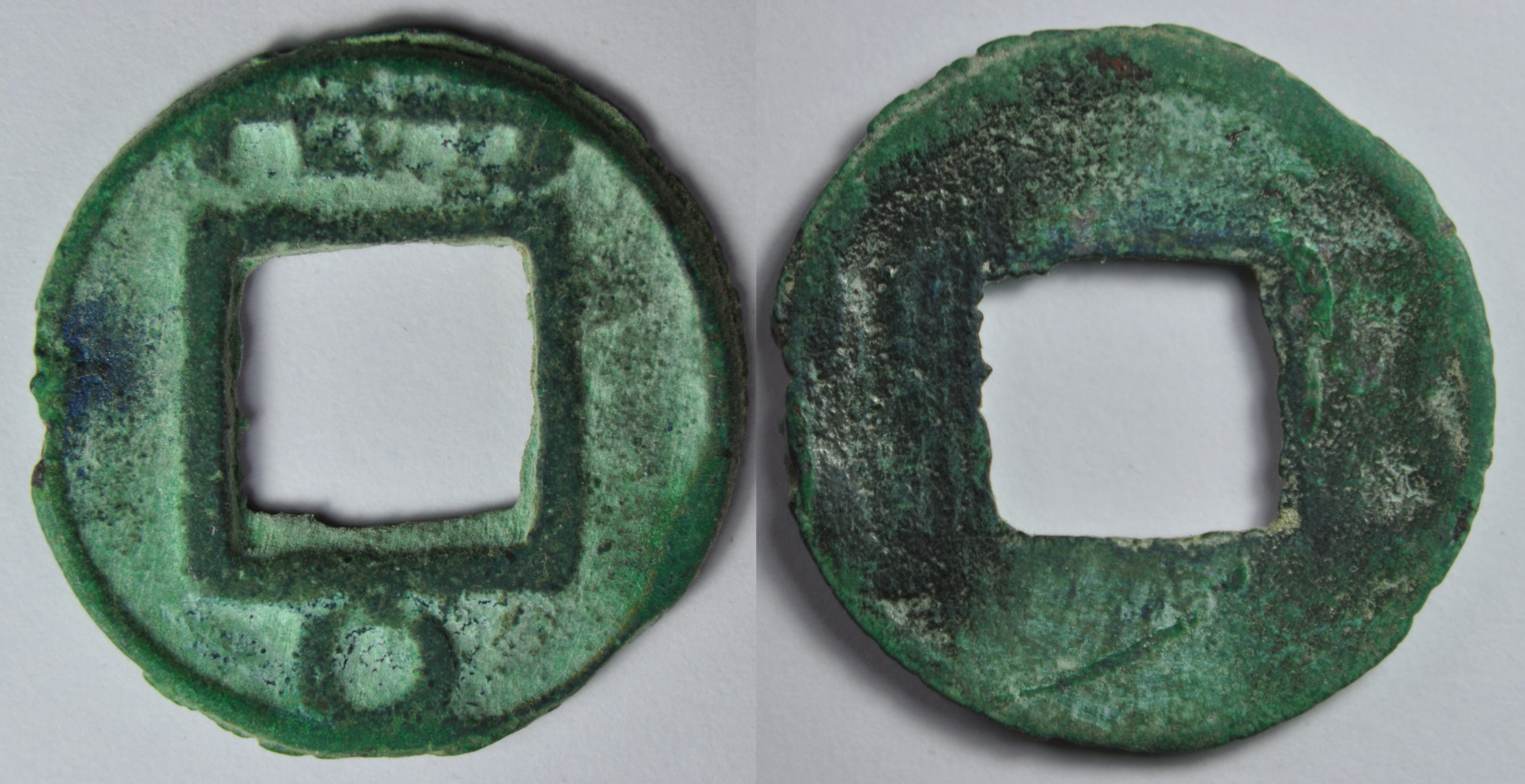
A "Han Gui bilingual Wu Zhu coin" (漢龜二體五銖錢) produced by the Kingdom of Kucha with both a Chinese and a Kuśiññe inscription

Kucha coinage was produced in the Kingdom of Kucha, a Buddhist, Tocharian-speaking state located in the Tarim Basin (present-day Kucha County, Xinjiang), during the 1st millennium CE.

There are five known types of Kucha cash coins, all of them based on Chinese Wu Zhu. These coins are usually characterized by their diminutive size and thin shape. They are generally believed to have been produced between the years 265 and 589.

== The kingdom ==
The Kingdom of Kucha was first recorded during the Han dynasty and was later annexed by the Tang. During its existence, it was a prominent player on the Silk Road. From around the third or fourth century, the Kingdom of Kucha began to manufacture Chinese-style cash coins inspired by the diminutive and devalued Wu Zhu currency of the post-Han dynasty era. It is very likely that the cash coins produced in Kucha predate the Kaiyuan Tongbao (開元通寶) and that the native production of coins stopped sometime after the year 621 when the Wu Zhu cash coins were discontinued in China proper.

== Coin description ==
There are five known types of Kucha cash coins based on Chinese Wu Zhu. These coins are usually characterized by their diminutive size and thin shape. Four types tend to have no inscriptions at all, while one type of coin is the "Han Gui bilingual Wu Zhu coin" (漢龜二體五銖錢, hàn guī èr tǐ wǔ zhū qián) which is characterized by its obverse side resembling Chinese Wu Zhu coins and reverse side featuring a local Kucha script above and below the square center hole. The Kuchean (Kuśiññe) language – the variety of Tocharian spoken in Kucha at the time – is not well understood (and was completely forgotten until its rediscovery in the early 20th century). Consequently, many hypotheses have been suggested about the meaning of the inscription, including that it is a literal translation of "Wu Zhu", or an alternate name of the Kingdom of Kucha in Kuchean.

Cash coins without any inscription cast in this region (龜茲無文小銅錢, qiūcí wú wén xiǎo tóng qián) are generally believed to have been produced between the years 265 and 589. The first variant of these cash coins are round in shape and have a rim around the square centre hole on one side (the other side is rimless). They tend to be thin on the outside and thicker on the inside, and they weigh between 0.4 grams and 1.7 grams with a diameter of 9 to 18 millimetres. The second variant of coin is similar to the aforementioned type but has no inner rim. These cash coins generally ranged from 8 to 13 millimetres in diameter and had a weight of 0.2 to 0.4 grams. The third type of these cash coins are also completely rimless but are square in shape and have a square centre hole. They tend to be very thin with diameters between 8 and 11 millimetres and weigh between 0.2 and 0.5 grams. The final variant are irregularly shaped, diminutive in size, thin, and are cast of poor workmanship. Some are merely five millimetres in diameter and weigh as little as 0.2 grams.

The Buddhist monk Xuanzang describes seeing "small bronze coins" during his visit to Kucha in the year 630 in his work "Great Tang Records on the Western Regions" during the Tang dynasty. These cash coins are likely to have been the inscribed variant, the "Han Gui bilingual Wu Zhu coin".

== List of cash coins produced by the Kingdom of Kucha ==
List of cash coins produced by the Kingdom of Kucha:

Inscription (obverse)	Inscription (reverse)	Approximate years of production	Differentiating features	Image
Blank	Blank	265–589	These have a rim around the square centre hole on one side while the other side is rimless. They tend to be thin on the outside and thick on the inside.	
Blank	Blank	265–589	Similar to the first type but these cash coins have no inner rim.	
Blank	Blank	265–589	These cash coins are completely without rim but are square in shape and have a square centre hole. They tend to be very thin.	
Blank	Blank	265–589	These cash coins are irregularly shaped, diminutive in size, thin, and cast of poor workmanship. Some are merely five millimeters in diameter and weigh as little as 0.2 grams.	
五銖 (Wu Zhu)	An undeciphered Kuśiññe language inscription.	Unknown	These are the only known cash coins produced by Kucha with an inscription.	

== See also ==
- Ancient Chinese coinage
- Silk Road numismatics
- Xinjiang coins

== Sources ==
- Hartill, David (2005). Cast Chinese Coins: A Historical Catalogue. Trafford. ISBN 978-1-4120-5466-9.
- ZHOU Ti, A new look at Sino-Kharoshthi coins (Horse coins of Khotan), (Shijiazhuang: Hebei renmin chubanshe, 2018) [in the Numismatics series, series editor Dai Jianbing]. ISBN 978-7-202-13321-7 173 pp. (周倜著：《汉佉二体钱（和田马钱）新探》，河北人民出版社，2018年。（钱币学丛书，丛书主编：戴建兵）。ISBN 978-7-202-13321-7). (in Mandarin Chinese).
