= Pingli County =

Coordinates: 32°18′42″N 109°18′30″E

Pingli County 平利县
- County
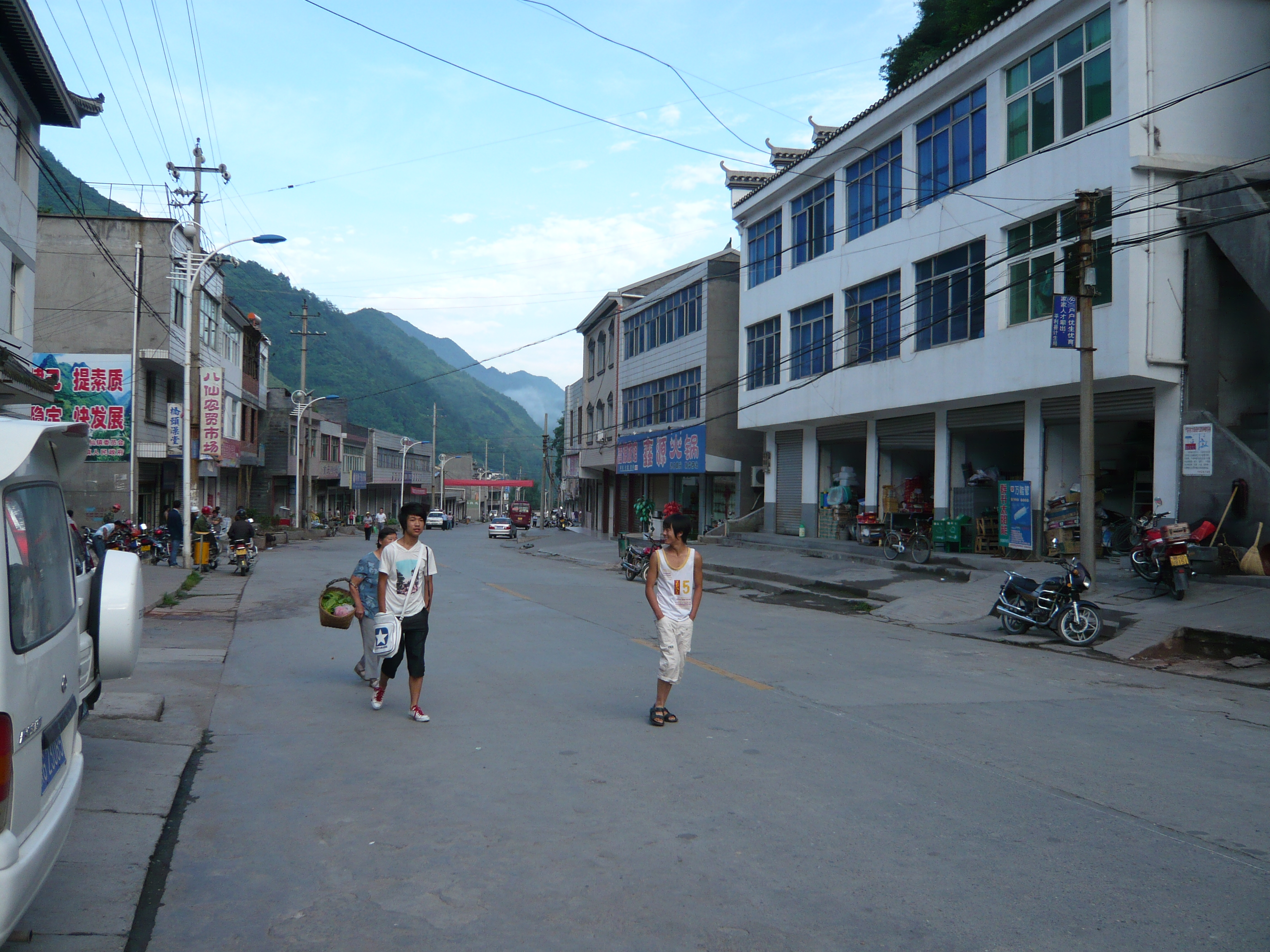

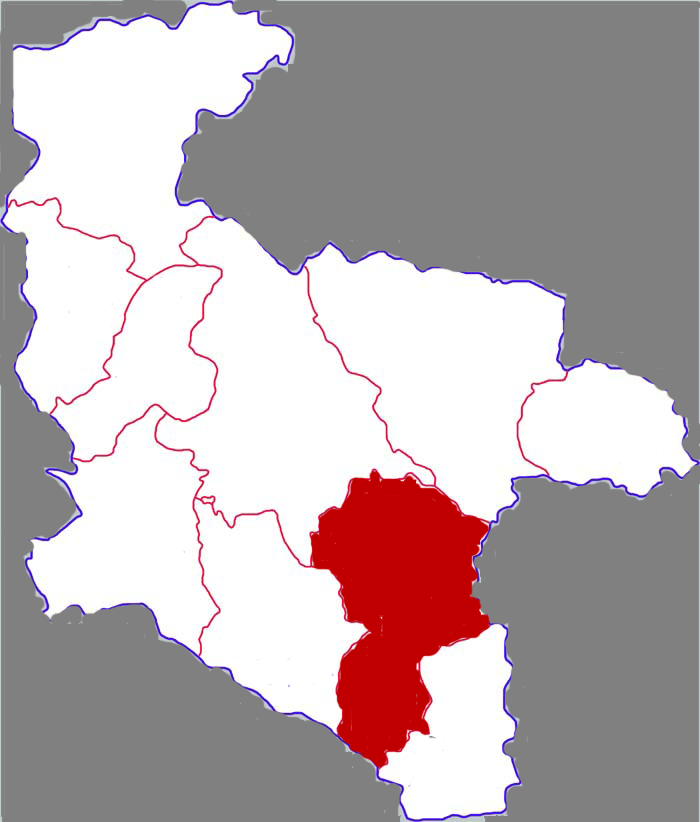
- Pingli in Ankang

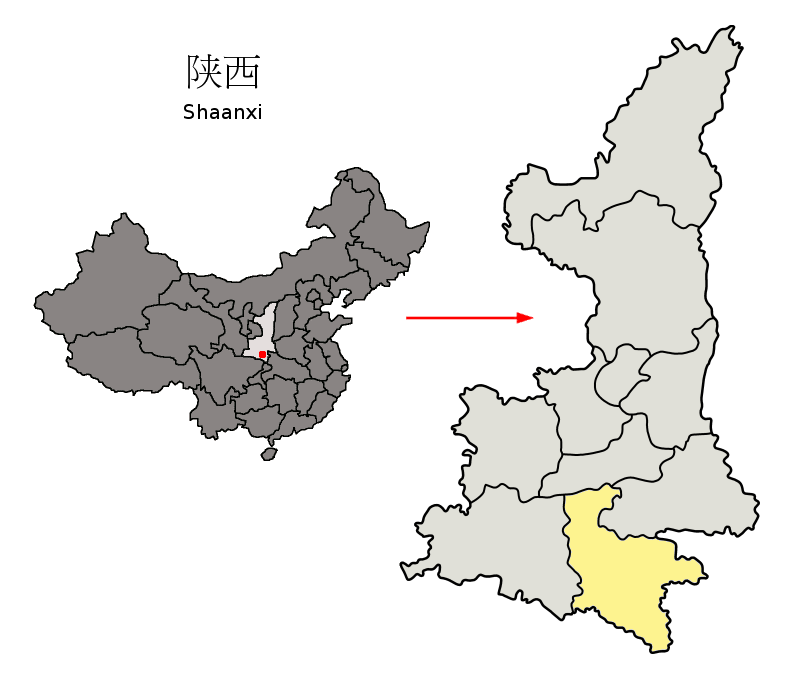
- Ankang in Shaanxi
- Country: People's Republic of China
- Province: Shaanxi
- Prefecture-level city: Ankang

Area
  - Total: 2,647 km^{2} (1,022 sq mi)

Population (2016)
  - Total: 194,907
  - Density: 73.63/km^{2} (190.7/sq mi)
- Time zone: UTC+8 (China standard time)
- Postal code: 725500
- Licence plates: 陕G

Pingli County (simplified Chinese: 平利县; traditional Chinese: 平利縣; pinyin: Pínglì Xiàn) is a county the southeast of Shaanxi province, China, bordering Chongqing to the south and Hubei province to the east. It is under the administration of the prefecture-level city of Ankang.

== History ==
Han dynasty tomb unearthed in 2006

In January 2006 during the construction of a plaza in Pingli County a Han dynasty era tomb was uncovered, during its excavation archeologists found 259 Wu Zhu cash coins, one tripod made from iron, a pottery kitchen range as well as three pottery urns.

== Administrative divisions ==
As of 2019, Pingli County is divided to 11 towns.

Towns

- Chengguan (城关镇)
- Xinglong (兴隆镇)
- Laoxian (老县镇)
- Dagui (大贵镇)
- Sanyang (三阳镇)
- Luohe (洛河镇)
- Guangfo (广佛镇)
- Baxian (八仙镇)
- Chang'an (长安镇)
- Zhengyang (正阳镇)
- Xihe (西河镇)

== Climate ==
Climate data for Pingli, elevation 431 m (1,414 ft), (1991–2020 normals, extremes 1981–present)
Month	Jan	Feb	Mar	Apr	May	Jun	Jul	Aug	Sep	Oct	Nov	Dec	Year
Record high °C (°F)	19.2 (66.6)	23.0 (73.4)	33.7 (92.7)	35.5 (95.9)	37.5 (99.5)	38.8 (101.8)	40.7 (105.3)	39.1 (102.4)	39.4 (102.9)	31.5 (88.7)	26.0 (78.8)	19.0 (66.2)	40.7 (105.3)
Mean daily maximum °C (°F)	9.1 (48.4)	11.8 (53.2)	17.6 (63.7)	23.6 (74.5)	26.6 (79.9)	30.1 (86.2)	32.1 (89.8)	30.7 (87.3)	26.1 (79.0)	21.1 (70.0)	15.3 (59.5)	10.2 (50.4)	21.2 (70.2)
Daily mean °C (°F)	3.5 (38.3)	6.3 (43.3)	10.9 (51.6)	16.3 (61.3)	20.0 (68.0)	23.9 (75.0)	26.3 (79.3)	25.2 (77.4)	21.1 (70.0)	16.0 (60.8)	10.0 (50.0)	4.8 (40.6)	15.4 (59.6)
Mean daily minimum °C (°F)	−0.1 (31.8)	2.5 (36.5)	6.1 (43.0)	11.0 (51.8)	15.3 (59.5)	19.4 (66.9)	22.2 (72.0)	21.5 (70.7)	17.8 (64.0)	12.9 (55.2)	6.7 (44.1)	1.3 (34.3)	11.4 (52.5)
Record low °C (°F)	−6.8 (19.8)	−5.2 (22.6)	−3.1 (26.4)	0.3 (32.5)	6.6 (43.9)	13.4 (56.1)	16.5 (61.7)	14.8 (58.6)	10.6 (51.1)	4.5 (40.1)	−1.9 (28.6)	−7.2 (19.0)	−7.2 (19.0)
Average precipitation mm (inches)	5.2 (0.20)	13.8 (0.54)	34.7 (1.37)	63.3 (2.49)	121.0 (4.76)	121.9 (4.80)	187.6 (7.39)	142.9 (5.63)	115.3 (4.54)	81.0 (3.19)	32.7 (1.29)	10.9 (0.43)	930.3 (36.63)
Average precipitation days (≥ 0.1 mm)	5.4	6.9	9.3	10.2	13.2	11.4	13.6	13.1	12.3	12.9	9.4	5.9	123.6
Average snowy days	3.8	2.7	0.7	0.1	0	0	0	0	0	0	0.5	1.6	9.4
Average relative humidity (%)	71	70	68	71	76	78	80	81	83	84	82	76	77
Mean monthly sunshine hours	104.2	90.8	137.9	165.9	163.1	166.9	191.9	175.4	117.6	105.9	100.2	102.8	1,622.6
Percentage possible sunshine	33	29	37	43	38	39	44	43	32	30	32	33	36
Source: China Meteorological Administration
