= Chengjia =

Self-proclaimed empire in China (25–36 AD)

Chengjia 成家
- 25 AD – 36 AD
- Capital: Chengdu
- Common languages: Old Chinese
- Government: Monarchy
- Emperor
  - 25–36: Gongsun Shu
- History
  - Proclamation of empire: May or June, 25 AD
  - Death of Gongsun Shu: 24 December 36 AD
  - Surrender of Chengdu: 25 December 36 AD
- Currency: Iron Wu Zhu cash coins
| Preceded by | Succeeded by |
| Xin dynasty | Eastern Han dynasty |
- Today part of: China

Chengjia
- Chinese: 成家
- Literal meaning: Cheng[du] dynasty
Transcriptions
Standard Mandarin
- Hanyu Pinyin: Chéngjiā
Middle Chinese
- Middle Chinese: /d͡ʑiᴇŋ kˠa/

Chengjia (Chinese: 成家; 25–36 AD), also called the Cheng dynasty or Great Cheng, was a self-proclaimed empire established by Gongsun Shu in 25 AD after the collapse of the Xin dynasty of Chinese history, rivalling the Eastern Han dynasty founded by Emperor Guangwu later in the same year. Based in the Sichuan Basin with its capital at Chengdu, Chengjia covered a large area including modern Sichuan, Chongqing, Guizhou, Yunnan, and southern Shaanxi, and comprised about 7% of China's population at the time. Chengjia was the most dangerous rival to the Eastern Han and was the last separatist regime in China to be conquered by the latter, in 36 AD.

== Names ==
Chengjia, literally the "House of Cheng", was named after its capital Chengdu. It was also called the Cheng dynasty or Great Cheng, meaning "complete" or "accomplished".

== Founding ==
After Wang Mang usurped the throne of the Western Han dynasty and proclaimed himself emperor of the Xin dynasty in 9 AD, he promoted Gongsun Shu to be the governor of Daojiang. (Note: the former Shu Commandery of Han) In 23, rebels overthrew Wang Mang and restored the Han dynasty under Liu Xuan, the Gengshi Emperor. Gongsun Shu ostensibly declared his allegiance to Gengshi while defeating an army sent by Liu to take over Shu. He assumed the titles General Fuhan (辅汉; "assisting Han") and Governor of Shu Commandery and of Yi Province (Note: which included most of modern Sichuan, Chongqing, Guizhou, and Yunnan). The following year, he declared himself the King of Shu under the Han empire, with Chengdu as his capital.

In the fourth lunar month (Note: corresponding to 17 May to 14 June in the Julian calendar) of 25 AD, Gongsun Shu declared himself emperor in defiance of Gengshi, whose throne was being threatened by the forces of Liu Xiu. He named his self-declared empire as Chengjia and adopted the era name Longxing (龍興, "Dragon Rising"). A few months later, Liu Xiu proclaimed himself Emperor Guangwu of the restored Han dynasty (Eastern Han).

== Expansion and consolidation ==
Chengjia initially only had direct control of the Sichuan basin. Soon, Ren Gui (任贵) took control of Yuesui Commandery (Note: modern southern Sichuan and northern Yunnan) and submitted to Chengjia. Gongsun Shu sent general Hou Dan (侯丹) to take over Hanzhong in the north and Ren Man (任滿) to Jiangzhou (modern Chongqing) to the east, and took control of the entire Yi Province of the Han dynasty. Other rebel forces who were defeated by Emperor Guangwu, most importantly Yan Cen (延岑) and Tian Rong (田戎), also submitted to Chengjia.

The warlord Wei Ao (隗嚣) (Note: The character "嚣" has two pronunciations: "áo" and "xiāo".), who controlled eastern Gansu and was under constant pressure from the Eastern Han, submitted to Chengjia. Gongsun Shu bestowed on Wei Ao the title King of Shuoning and sent a force to support him.

At the time, Emperor Guangwu was embroiled in the civil war engulfing much of China, and Gongsun Shu's advisor proposed attacking Han while it was still weak. However, despite Chengjia's vast territory, its population comprised only 7% of China's total at the time, and Gongsun Shu rejected the proposal. Still, Chengjia remained Han's most dangerous rival, and Guangwu took care not to antagonize Gongsun Shu, even addressing him as "emperor" in his letters.

== Demise ==
Chengjia remained independent for more than ten years, owing to the natural defences enjoyed by the Sichuan basin, and the unsettled conditions in the newly established Eastern Han. In 34, Emperor Guangwu conquered Gansu, held by Wei Chun, the son and successor of Wei Ao. Chengjia sent general Li Yu (李育) with a force of more than 10,000 to assist Wei Chun, to no avail.

After Guangwu conquered the rest of China, he dispatched a force led by Cen Peng (岑彭) to conquer Chengjia. Below the Three Gorges on the Yangtze, Chengjia's eastern frontier, Chengjia forces built a floating bridge across the river mounted with war towers, linking fortifications on both banks. In April or May of 35, aided by a favourable easterly wind, Han naval forces sailed upstream to the bridge and attacked it with torches. The wooden bridge caught fire and burned down, removing the obstacle to Han invasions by water.

Despite the initial success, the Han campaign was slow and difficult because of natural obstacles. Moreover, Chengjia sent assassins who managed to kill general Lai Xi (來歙) and then Cen Peng, chief commander of the Han forces, which were subsequently led by Wu Han and Zang Gong (臧宫). The Han forces reached Chengdu in December of 36, with only a week's supplies left. They were on the verge of accepting failure and withdrawing, when Gongsun Shu decided to personally lead an attack on the Han forces on 24 December. Wounded in the battle, he died in the night, and the defenders of Chengdu under Marshal Yan Cen surrendered the following day, marking the end of Chengjia.

Two days later, Wu Han granted his soldiers permission to loot Chengdu and burn down the imperial palace. He massacred Gongsun's extended family including his wife and children, as well as Yan Cen and his family. Many other people were also killed. The court musicians of Chengjia were later sent to the Han capital Luoyang.

== Government ==
Gongsun Shu modelled his government after that of the Han dynasty, and appointed his advisor Li Xiong and his younger brothers, Guang and Hui, as the Three Excellencies. Gongsun Guang was the grand marshal (sima), Gongsun Hui the minister of works (sikong), and Li Xiong the minister of the masses (situ). After Yan Cen and Tian Rong submitted to Chengjia, Yan was appointed grand marshal and enfeoffed as King of Runing (汝寧王), and Tian was enfeoffed as King of Yijiang (翼江王).

== Coinage ==
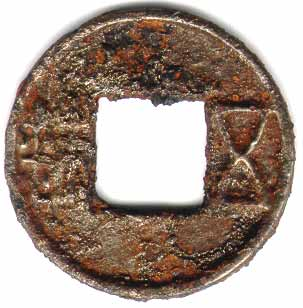
An iron Wu Zhu coin of Chengjia, inscribed with the words Wu Zhu

Gongsun Shu abolished Han dynasty copper coins and issued his own Wu Zhu coins for Chengjia, which resemble the Han Wu Zhu coins but are made of iron, possibly because Sichuan was then China's dominant producer of the metal. However, the change of currency proved unpopular with the people.
