= Gongsun Shu =

Chinese warlord (died 36)

- Traditional Chinese: 公孫述
- Simplified Chinese: 公孙述
Transcriptions
Standard Mandarin
- Hanyu Pinyin: Gōngsūn Shù
- Wade–Giles: Kung^{1}-sun^{1} Shu^{4}
- IPA: [kʊ́ŋ.swə́n ʂû]

Gongsun Shu (Chinese: 公孫述, died 24 December 36 AD) was the founder and only emperor of the Cheng dynasty, a state that controlled China's Sichuan Basin from 25 to 36 AD. A successful official of the Western Han and short-lived Xin dynasties, Gongsun was the Administrator of Daojiang Commandery when the Xin regime fell in 23, amid rebellions aimed at restoring the Han dynasty. Through a series of political and military maneuvers, Gongsun secured control of Yi Province and in 24 proclaimed himself king of Shu. In the following year, he assumed imperial title and founded the Cheng dynasty. Under his administration, the Sichuan region experienced a period of peace and economic prosperity, and the city of Chengdu was developed into an imperial capital. But Gongsun adopted a defensive military posture that kept his influence confined within Sichuan while Liu Xiu's revived Eastern Han regime secured the North China Plain. In 36, Gongsun was mortally wounded in battle against an Eastern Han invasion force, and Chengjia capitulated on the following day.

== Early life and career ==
Gongsun Shu was born into a family of officials in Youfufeng (右扶風, present day Xingping) during the Western Han dynasty; his precise year of birth is unknown. His courtesy name was Ziyang (Chinese: 子陽). His father, Gongsun Ren, served as an imperial clerk in the Censorate in the court of Emperor Ai of Han, and was later appointed Governor of Henan Commandery (modern Luoyang). His father's high position entitled Shu to entry into officialdom as a gentleman cadet.

When Gongsun Shu was appointed magistrate of Qingshui County in Tianshui Commandery, his father was worried about his inexperience and sent one of his subordinates to advise him, but the officer returned only a month later, saying Shu did not need help. His capability was recognized by his superior, the Governor of Tianshui, who made him the head of four more counties. His ability to maintain order earned him a reputation throughout the commandery.

After Wang Mang usurped the Han throne and established the Xin dynasty, in about 15 AD he appointed Gongsun Shu the Governor of Daojiang (導江, the former Shu Commandery of Han), with its capital at Linqiong, near Chengdu. Gongsun held the position until the forces of the Gengshi Emperor overthrew the Xin dynasty in 23 AD.

== As Emperor of Cheng ==
As the Xin dynasty was facing a large number of rebellions, Gongsun proclaimed himself to be the King of Shu (蜀王) and in 25 asserted independence by adopting the title of Emperor of Cheng dynasty while adopting the era name of Longxing (龍興, "Dragon Rising).

As ruler of Cheng, Gongsun Shu built an imperial palace and created a bureaucracy to oversee the administration of his new empire. He controlled the entirety of the former Yi Province, an economically prosperous region that allowed Gongsun Shu to build and supply a large military force. In 26, Gongsun Shu sent general Hou Dan to conquer the region of Hanzhong north of Sichuan in southern Shaanxi along the Han River.

In 33 Gongsun Shu sent generals Tian Rong (田戎) and Yan Cen (延岑) down the Three Gorges of the Yangtze to conquer the Nan Commandery in modern Hubei but did not advance far.

== Death ==
In 35, Emperor Guangwu ordered an army to conquer Chengjia. When the Han forces entered Sichuan, Guangwu offered Gongsun Shu terms of surrender, which Gongsun refused. The campaign was slow and difficult and lasted more than a year. In December 36, Han forces under generals Wu Han and Zang Gong reached Chengdu with only a week's supplies left. They were on the verge of accepting failure and withdrawing, when Gongsun Shu personally led an attack on the Han forces on 24 December. Wounded in the battle, he died in the night, and the defenders of Chengdu under general Yan Cen surrendered the following day, marking the end of Chengjia.

After entering Chengdu, Wu Han ordered the massacre of Gongsun Shu's wife, children, and other relatives, as well as Yan Cen and his family.

== See also ==
- Baidicheng
