= Silk Road numismatics =

Special field within the study of currencies

Silk Road Numismatics is a special field within Silk Road studies and within numismatics. It is particularly important because it covers a part of the world where history is not always clear – either because the historical record is incomplete or is contested. For example, numismatics has played a central role in determining the chronology of the Kushan kings.

== Silk Road Coins ==
Silk Road numismatics includes all coinage traditions from East Asia to Europe, from earliest times. There is a great deal of merging of coinage traditions at locations on the Silk Road, and expertise in several coinage traditions is required to understand these. A notable example is the Sino-Kharoshthi coinage of Khotan, in which two coinage traditions come together - these coins are bilingual, with a Kharoshthi inscription on one side and a Chinese inscription on the other. They relate to both the Attic standard of ancient Greek coinage and to the wuzhu system of the Han dynasty, and name the local kings of Khotan, for whom there is no indigenous historical record.

Training
As with all branches of numismatics, most training is object-based, and therefore tends to take place where there are specialist collections. The Hirayama Trainee Curatorship in Silk Road Numismatics was established in the early 1990s, as "a five-year project to enable young scholars at the beginning of their careers, to come to the British Museum for a full academic year to develop their knowledge of Silk Road coins." The five scholars were Chandrika Jayasinghe (Dept of Archaeology, Colombo, Sri Lanka), Naushaba Anjum (Lahore Museum, Pakistan), Sergei Kovalenko (Pushkin Museum, Moscow, Russia), Shah Nazar Khan (Peshawar University Museum, Pakistan), Wang Dan (China Numismatic Society, China). Other scholars have received grants from the Neil Kreitman Central Asian Numismatic Endowment, administered by the Royal Numismatic Society.

== Silk Road Money ==
Coins were not the only form of money on the Silk Road, as recent studies on textiles have shown.

== Exhibitions and displays ==
Long-term

- Silk Road Coin Gallery, at the Shanghai Museum (with catalogue)
- Silk Road Coins at the British Museum - in the Joseph E. Hotung Gallery (Room 33) and the Citi Money Gallery (Room 68)

Short-term

- 1992 The Crossroads of Asia : transformation in image and symbol in the art of ancient Afghanistan and Pakistan (Fitzwilliam Museum, 1992). (see catalogue)
- 1993 Silk Road Coins: the Hirayama Collection. A special loan exhibition from Japan (British Museum, 1993). (see catalogue)
- 1997 From Persepolis to the Punjab: Coins and the Exploration of the East (British Museum, 1997) (see publication)

== Exhibition catalogues ==
- 1992 The Crossroads of Asia : transformation in image and symbol in the art of ancient Afghanistan and Pakistan, by Joe Cribb and Elizabeth Errington, with Maggie Claringbull (Cambridge: Ancient India and Iran Trust, 1992).
- 1993 Silk Road Coins: The Hirayama Collection by Katsumi Tanabe (Kamakura: Silk Road Institute, 1993).
- 2006 Shanghai Museum's Collection of Ancient Coins from the Silk Road 《上海博物馆藏丝绸之路古代国家钱币》 (Shanghai: Shanghai Museum, 2006). ISBN 9787807253938
