= Ancient Chinese coinage =

Coin production and deployment

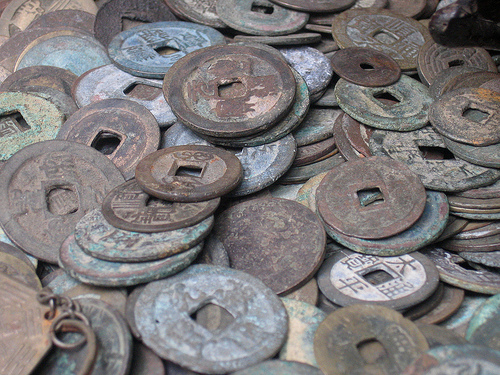
Ancient Chinese coins

Ancient Chinese coinage includes some of the earliest known coins of all time. These coins, used as early as the Spring and Autumn period (770–476 BCE), took the form of imitations of the cowrie shells that were used in ceremonial exchanges. The same period also saw the introduction of the first metal coins; however, they were not initially round, instead being either knife shaped or spade shaped. Round metal coins with a round, and then later square hole in the center were first introduced around 350 BCE. The beginning of the Qin dynasty (221–206 BCE), the first dynasty to unify China, saw the introduction of a standardised coinage for the whole Empire. Subsequent dynasties produced variations on these round coins throughout the imperial period. At first, the distribution of the coinage was limited to use around the capital city district, but by the beginning of the Han dynasty, coins were widely used for such things as paying taxes, salaries and fines.

Ancient Chinese coins are markedly different from their European counterparts. Chinese coins were manufactured by being cast in moulds, whereas European coins were typically cut and hammered or, in later times, milled. Chinese coins were usually made from mixtures of metals such copper, tin and lead, from bronze, brass or iron: precious metals like gold and silver were uncommonly used. The ratios and purity of the coin metals varied considerably. Most Chinese coins were produced with a square hole in the middle. This was used to allow collections of coins to be threaded on a square rod so that the rough edges could be filed smooth, and then threaded on strings for ease of handling.

Some coins were produced in very large numbers – during the Western Han, an average of 220 million coins a year were produced. Other coins were of limited circulation and are today extremely rare – only six examples of Da Quan Wu Qian from the Eastern Wu dynasty (222–280 CE) are known to exist. Occasionally, large hoards of coins have been uncovered. For example, a hoard was discovered in Jiangsu containing 4,000 Tai Qing Feng Le coins, and at Zhangpu in Shaanxi, a sealed jar containing 1,000 Ban Liang coins of various weights and sizes was discovered.

== Pre-Imperial (770–220 BCE) ==
The earliest Chinese coinage emerged during the Zhou dynasty amid growing trade, urbanization, and socio-economic changes in the Spring and Autumn (770–476 BCE) and Warring States (475–221 BCE) periods. As described by the historian Sima Qian around 100 BCE:

With the opening of exchange between farmers, artisans, and merchants, there came into use money of tortoise shells, cowrie shells, gold, coins (Chinese: 錢; pinyin: qián), knives (刀; dāo), spades (布; bù). This has been so from remote antiquity.

While tortoise shells are mentioned but unattested as currency, gold and cowries (real or imitations) circulated south of the Yellow River. Spade and knife money are the best-documented forms, evolving from agricultural tools into standardized exchange media. Items like fish, halberds, or metal chimes, sometimes sold as coins, lack hoard evidence and are likely funerary objects. Socio-economic conditions—similar to those in ancient Greece—favored this adoption, with archaeological finds confirming spade and knife use from the Spring and Autumn period onward.

=== Cowries ===
Cowrie shells held significant value in the Shang dynasty (c. 1600–1046 BCE), as shown by inscriptions and archaeology. During the Zhou period, they often appeared as royal or noble gifts and rewards. Later imitations in bone, stone or bronze likely served as money in some cases.

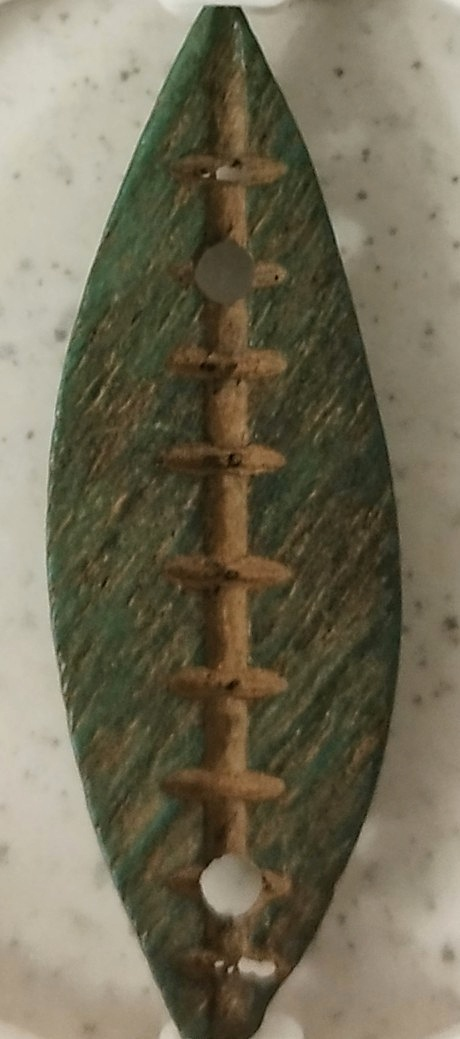
Cowrie shell imitation in green bone, China, Western Zhou dynasty (1046–771 BCE), Jin State; length: 40.3 mm

Some scholars propose that the first metallic Chinese coins were bronze cowrie imitations, with examples from a tomb near Anyang around 900 BCE, though these lack inscriptions.

Inscribed bronze pieces, known as Ant Nose Money (蟻鼻錢; yǐ bí qián) or Ghost Face Money (鬼臉錢; guǐ liǎn qián), were definitely used as currency from the Late Spring and Autumn to Early Warring States periods (6th–5th centuries BCE). Found mainly south of the Yellow River in Chu territory—one hoard contained about 16,000 pieces—these show variable weights and high lead content in the alloy. The name "Ant Nose" derives from the inscription's appearance, unrelated to any funerary practice.

=== Gold ===
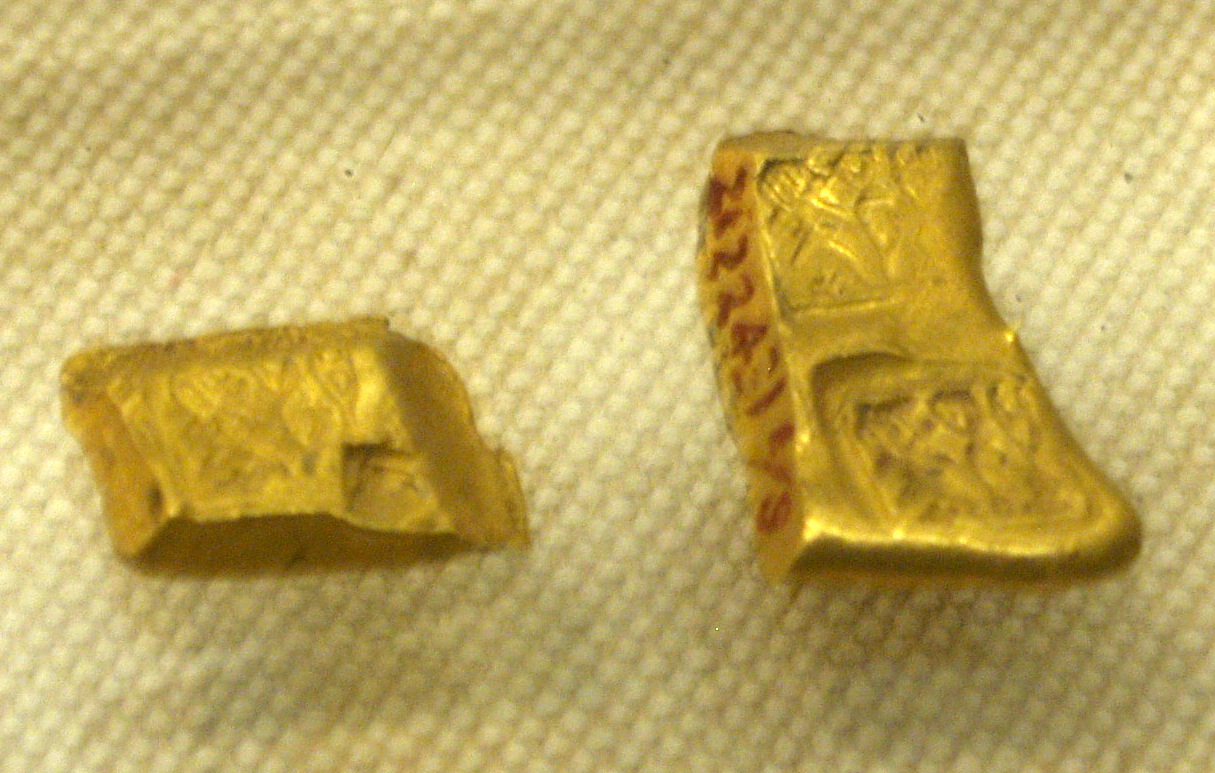
Gold coins marked with "Ying yuan". "Ying" being the name of the Chu capital.

The only known minted gold coinage from this era is Chu gold block money (郢爰; yǐng yuán), consisting of 3–5 mm thick gold sheets in varying sizes, stamped with square or round inscriptions (one or two characters). Unearthed south of the Yellow River, these are linked to the State of Chu. One character often denotes a monetary unit or weight, read as yuan (爰; yuán). Stamps validated the entire block rather than marking break points. Specimens in copper, lead, or clay are likely funerary, found in tombs, unlike genuine gold examples.

=== Jade pieces ===
It has been suggested that pieces of jade were a form of money in the Shang dynasty.

=== Money brand ===
Metal money brands (錢牌; qián pái) were rarely used in the state of Chu. They reappeared in the Song dynasty.

=== Spade money ===
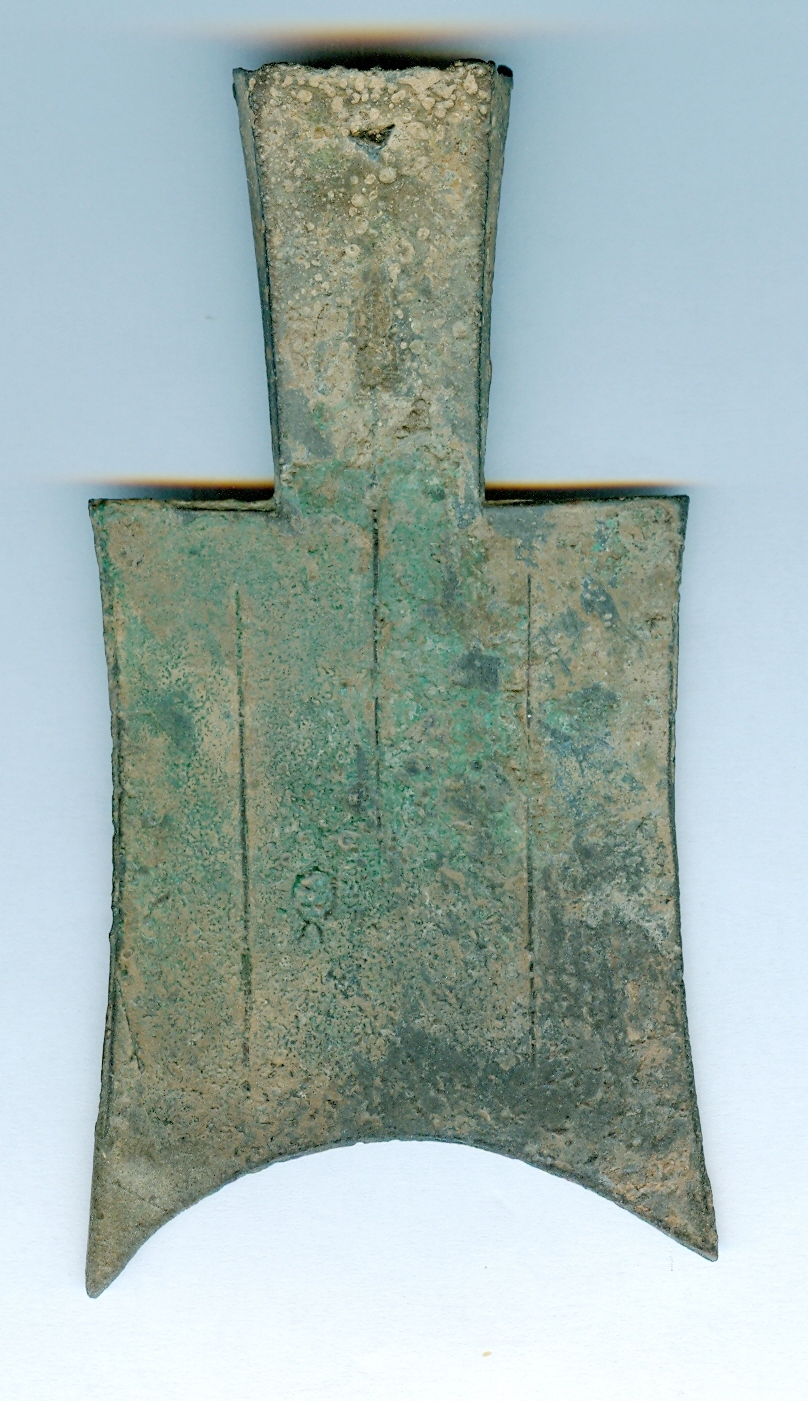
Spade money

Spade money evolved from weeding tools used in barter to stylized currency forms.

==== Hollow handled spade money ====
Hollow handled spades (布幣; bùbì) bridge functional tools and monetary objects. Too flimsy for practical use, they retain a rectangular hollow socket (with casting clay remnants) and a handle-attachment hole.

- Prototype spade money: Similar in shape and size to original implements. Some are robust enough for field use; others are lighter with inscriptions (likely city names). Found in Shang and Western Zhou tombs (c. 1200–800 BCE); inscribed examples date to c. 700 BCE.
- Square shoulder spades: Feature square shoulders, straight or slightly curving foot, and three parallel lines on obverse/reverse. Found in hundreds in the Zhou Royal Domain (south Hebei, north Henan), dating to early Spring and Autumn (c. 650 BCE onward). Inscriptions are single characters (numbers, cyclical, place/clan names); over 200 known, many undeciphered. Writing is crude artisan style, consistent with mid-Zhou. Alloy: typically 80% copper, 15% lead, 5% tin. Hoards contain hundreds, often bundled; clearly not small change.
- Sloping shoulder spades: Have sloping shoulders; outside lines angled, central line often absent. Smaller than prototypes or square-shoulder types; clearer two-character inscriptions. Associated with Zhou Kingdom and Henan; smaller size suggests later date.
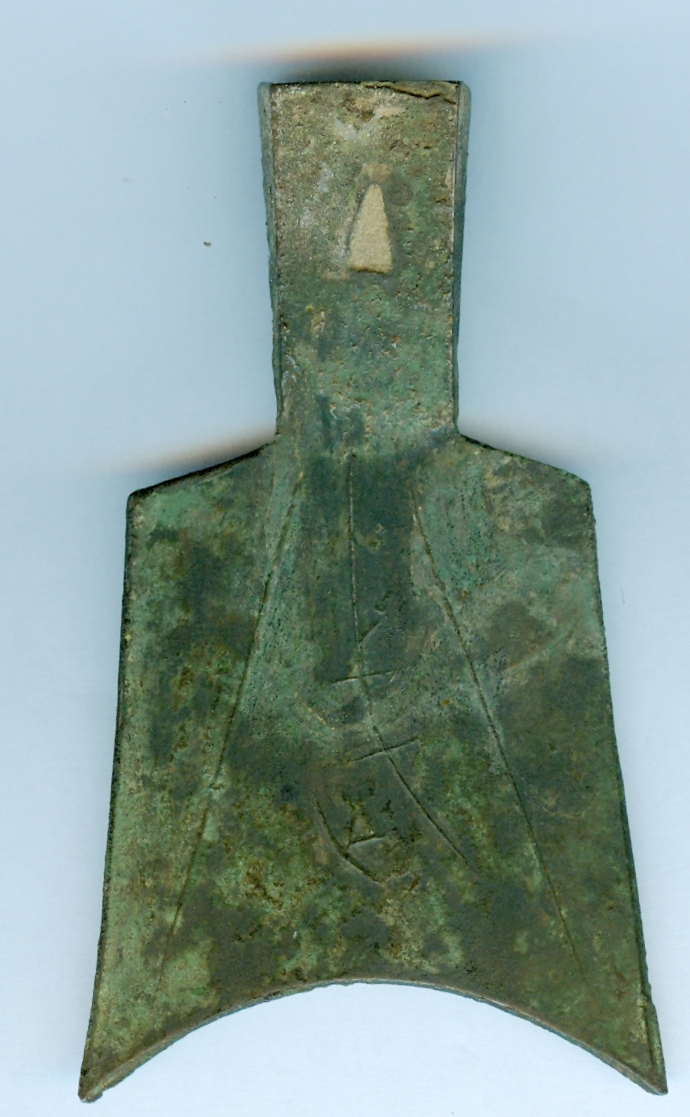
  Sloping shoulder money
- Pointed shoulder spades: Pointed shoulders/feet, long hollow handle; three parallel lines, occasional inscriptions. Found in northeastern Henan and Shanxi (Jin, later Zhao). Later than square-shoulder; shape aids bundling.

==== Flat-handled spade money ====
Flat-handled spades lack the hollow handle, featuring distinct legs (influenced by pointed-shoulder types but stylized for handling). Generally smaller, with denominations and place names in inscriptions. Dated to the Warring States (475–221 BCE) by mint-town evidence and archaeology. Arched-foot alloy ~80% copper; others 40–70%.

- Arched foot spades: Arched crutch (often inverted U); rounded/angular shoulders. Denominations: half, one, or two jin. Associated with Liang/Wei (425–344 BCE) and Han (403–230 BCE).
- Special spades of Liang: Similar shape; inscriptions debated but now linked to Liang, relating jin to lie unit.
- Pointed foot spades: Pointed feet, square crutch; shoulders up/straight. Descendant of pointed-shoulder hollow types. Larger match one jin; smaller often half jin (or unspecified). Associated with State of Zhao; finds in Shanxi/Hebei. Numerals on reverses; two-character mint names aid identification.

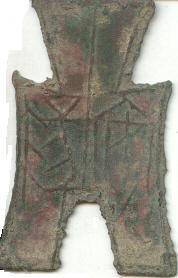
Square foot spade of An Yang

- Square foot spades: Square feet/crutch; central obverse line. Reverses usually have three lines (some Zhao mints add numerals). More mints than pointed-foot; weights match half jin. Associated with Han, Zhao, Liang, Zhou, Yan; widespread finds (Inner Mongolia to Zhejiang). Contemporary with pointed-foot; some mints issued both; found together in hoards. * Sharp-cornered spades: Sub-series of square-foot; triangular handle projections. Larger inscriptions include jin (金; jīn) and nie (涅; niè), interpreted as "metal coin" (nie = hua/money per Fang Yan). Weights slightly above 14g jin standard; finds match Liang/Han.
- Dang Jin spades: Inscriptions suggest unit equivalence across areas; jin (伒; jìn) character. Larger ~28g (twice standard jin); smaller 7–8g (quarter). Smaller often cast joined at the feet. Consensus reading: [City of] Pei coin equivalent to a jin (斾比當伒; pèi bǐ dāng jìn).
- Round foot spades: Round handle/shoulders/feet. Rare; from five Shanxi cities (Fen-Yellow Rivers area). Two sizes (one/half jin); reverse numerals. Attributed variably to late Qin/Zhao or 4th-century Zhongshan.
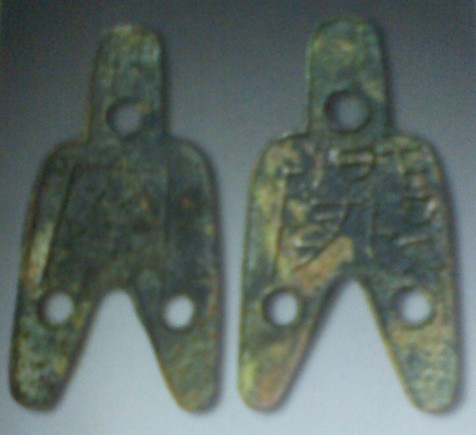
  Three-hole bu money
- Three-hole spades: Holes in handle/feet; round handle/shoulders/feet. Rare. Large: reverse liang (兩; liǎng); small: shi'er zhu (十二銖; shí'èr zhū) (12 zhu). Liang = 24 zhu, so one/half denominations; reverse series numbers on handle. Mint cities occupied by Zhongshan/Zhao; finds in eastern Shanxi/Hebei.

=== Knife money ===
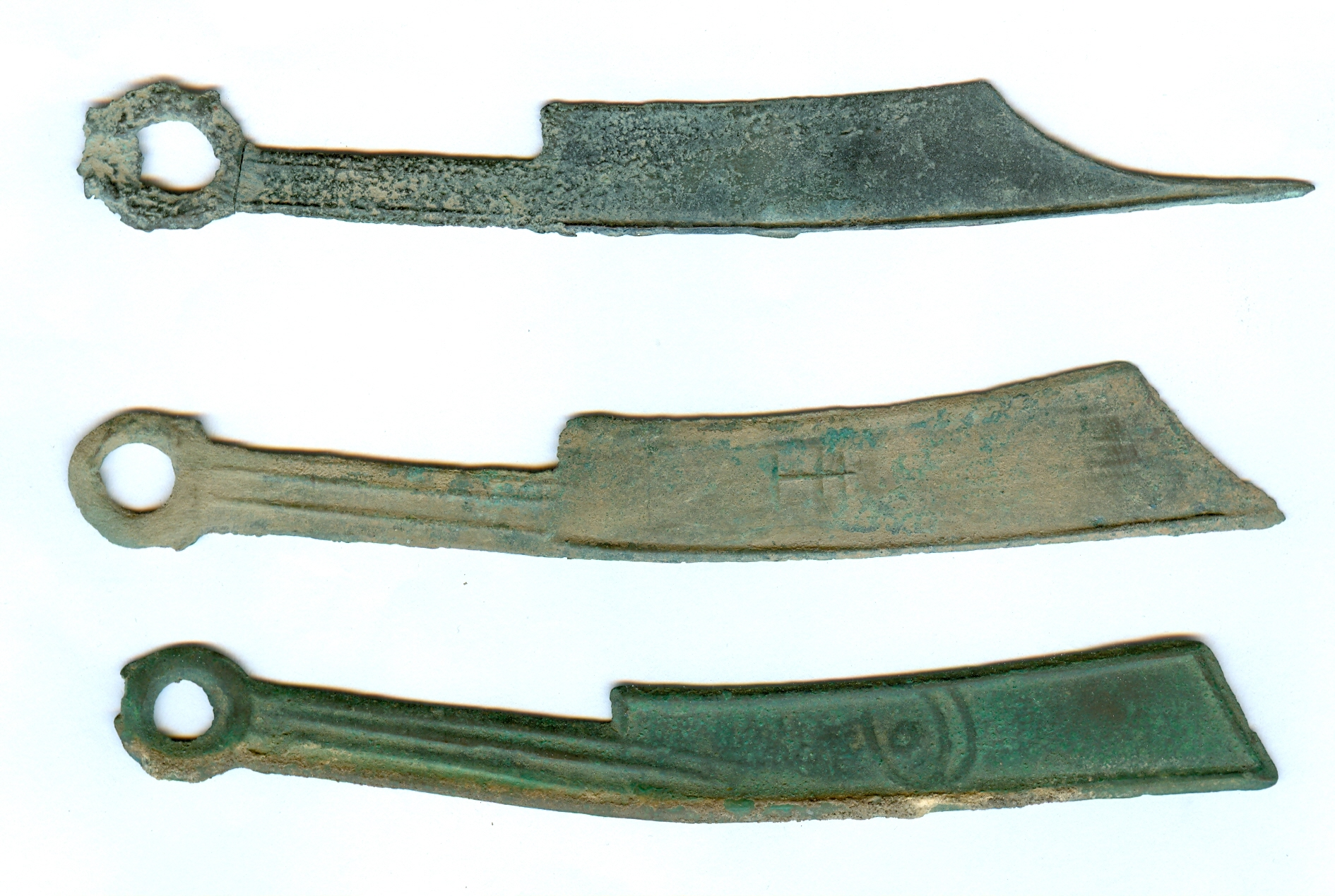
Yan State knife money (燕国刀币)

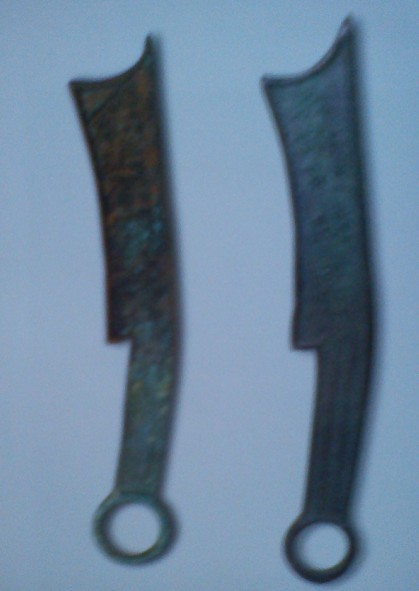
Six-word knife money

Knife money retained the shape of Zhou-period knives, evolving parallel to spade money in northeastern China.

- Qi knives: Large; attributed to State of Qi (Shandong); limited circulation outside area. Warring States date per archaeology. Named by inscription characters (Three, Four, etc.). Some reverses have three lines/marks. Inscription refers to Qi establishment (possible dates: 1122, 894, 685, or 386 BCE; the latter two are the most likely). Three-Character alloy ~54% copper/38% lead/8% tin; Four/Five-Character ~70% copper.
- Needle tip knives: Long pointed tip. Unknown until 1932 Chengde (Hebei) hoard; later finds nearby. Possibly for Chinese-Xiongnu trade; perhaps local variant or original inconvenient form. ~50 inscriptions (numbers, cyclical, undeciphered).
- Pointed tip knives: Curved blade end (no long point). Northeastern finds link to State of Yan. Hoards of up to 2,000, bundled (25/50/100). >160 inscriptions (numbers/cyclical; many undeciphered; not tied to place names). Variable size/weight (11–16 g); sub-types proposed.
- Ming knives: Smaller; straighter tips. Obverse character traditionally ming (明; míng); alternatives: yi (易), ju (莒), meng (盟), zhao (召). Xiadu (Yan capital Yi from 360 BCE) mint favors yi. Moulds in Shandong. Widespread finds: Hebei/Henan/Shandong/Shanxi/Shaanxi/Manchuria/Korea/Japan; often with pointed/square-foot spades.

Two shapes: early curved (like pointed-tip); later straight with angled qing (磬; chime stone) bend. Alloy ~40% copper; ~16 g.

Reverses: single characters/numerals (like pointed-tip); large groups start you (右; right/junior/west) or zuo (左; left/senior/east), followed by numerals/characters (consistent system); smaller wai (外; outside) group; fourth unclear (analogous to nei/內 inside or zhong/中 centre).

- State of Qi Ming knives (Boshan knives): Similar appearance; large angular ming. Extensive reverses. Jiaqing-era (1796–1820) Boshan (eastern Shandong) hoard; later finds same area (Qi territory). Likely from the Yan occupation of Qi (284–279 BCE). Reverses possibly place names (one reading: Ju/莒 for Ju city).
- Straight knives: Smaller, non/slightly curved blades. Issued by a few Zhao places; various shapes. Found in hoards with Ming knives.

=== Early round coins ===
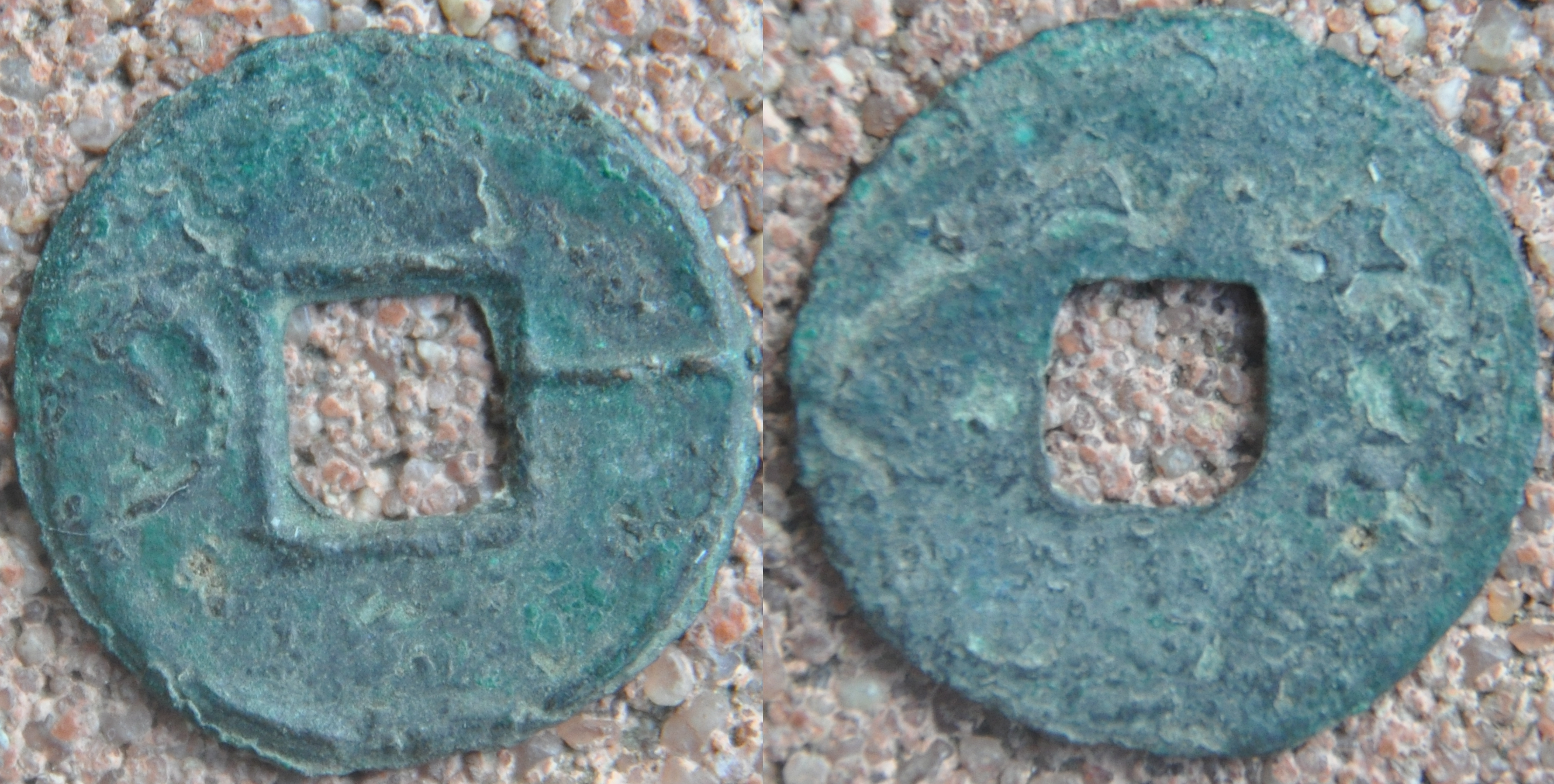
A one hua coin from Yan.

Round coins (圜錢 huánqián or 圜金 huánjīn), precursors to cash coins, circulated in both spade and knife areas from ~350 BCE.

Spade-area coins had round holes ("good") in the face ("meat"), denominated in yǐn (釿) centrally or liǎng (兩) in Qin. Knife-area had square holes, denominated in huà (化). Archaeology shows mixed circulation: 1981 Hebi (Henan) hoard: 3,537 Gong spades, 3 Anyi arched-foot, 8 Liang Dang Lie, 18 Liang square-foot, 1,180 Yuan round (in jars). 1984 Liaoning: 2,280 Yi Hua round, 14 spades, 120 Ming knives. 1960 Shandong: 2 Yi Hua round with 600 Qi round/59 Qi knives. 1976 Luoyang: 116 flat-handled spades (various), 46 Anzang round, 1 yuan round, small/sloping spades (Sanchuan etc.).

== Qin dynasty ==
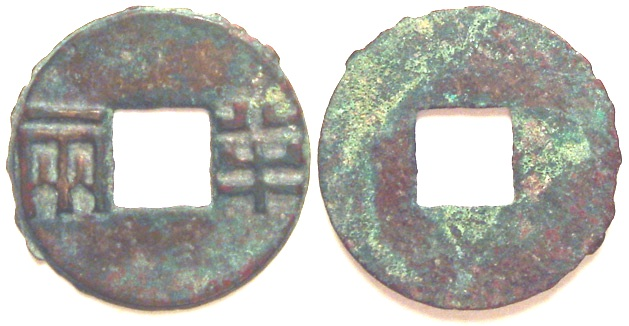
A Western Han Ban Liang, displaying the inscription 半兩 written right to left on the obverse and a blank reverse.

These coins were traditionally associated with Qin Shi Huang Di, the first Chinese Emperor, who united China in 221 BCE. The History of Han says: "When Qin united the world, it made two sorts of currency: that of yellow gold, which was called yì (鎰) and was the currency of the higher class; and that of bronze, which was similar in quality to the coins of Zhou, but bore an inscription saying Half Ounce, and was equal in weight to its inscription."

Ban Liang or Banliang coins take their name from their original size and typical two-character inscription 半兩 (bànliǎng), meaning "half liang", written right to left in Classical Chinese. The liang was a small Qin unit of weight, also known as the "tael" or "Chinese ounce", approximately equal to 16 g (0.56 oz). The liang was divided into 24 zhu (銖, zhū), so that the Ban Liang coins were each notionally 12 zhu or about 8 g (0.28 oz). The inscription was maintained through repeated rounds of debasement and despite constant counterfeiting, however, so that in practice Ban Liangs are found in a great variety of sizes and calligraphic styles and are difficult to date and classify exactly, especially with regard to local and unofficial mints.

Archaeological evidence now shows that the Ban Liang was first issued in the Warring States period by the State of Qin, possibly as early as 378 BC. A remarkable find was some bamboo tablets, amongst which were found regulations (drawn up before 242 BCE) concerning metal and cloth money. A thousand coins, good and bad mixed, were to be placed in pen (baskets or jars) and sealed with the Seal of the Director. At Zhangpu in Shaanxi, a sealed jar containing 1,000 Ban Liang of various weights and sizes was discovered. 7 Ban Liang were found in a tomb datable to 306 BCE.

At the beginning of the Western Han dynasty around 200 BCE, the people were allowed to cast small light coins known as "elm seed" coins (榆莢, yú jiá), as the heavy Qin coins were inconvenient. In 186 BCE, the official coin weight was reduced to 8 zhu, and in 182 BCE, a 5 fen coin (五分, wǔ fēn) weighing 2.4 zhu, one fifth of Ban Liang's proper half ounce size. In 175 BCE, the weight was set at 4 zhu. Private minting was permitted again, but with strict regulation of the weight and alloy. In 119 BCE, the Ban Liang was replaced by the San Zhu (三銖) weighing 3 zhu and then the Wu Zhu (五銖) weighing 5 zhu.

== Han dynasty ==
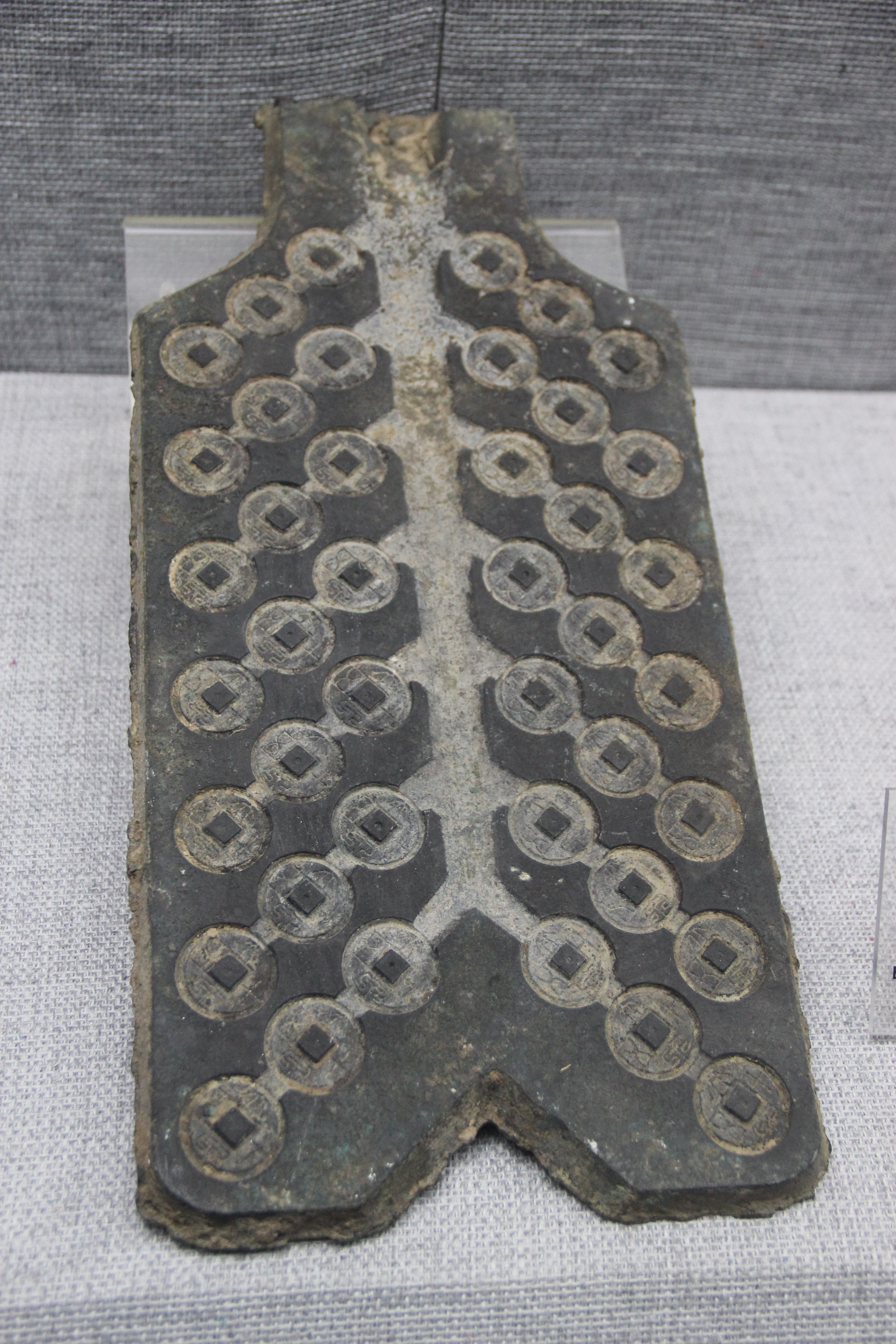
Han dynasty coin mould

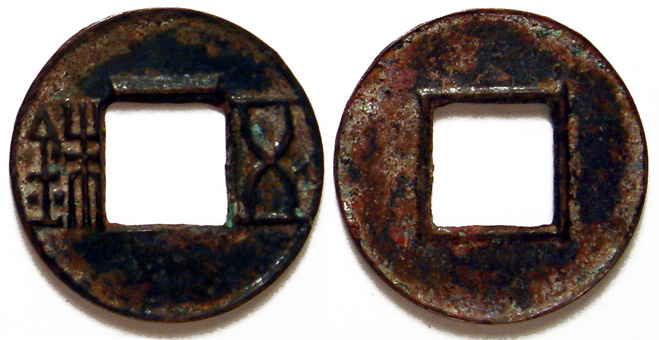
Obverse and reverse of a Shang Lin San Guan Wu Zhu coin.

By the Han dynasty, a full monetary economy had taken shape. Taxes, salaries, and fines were paid in coins, with an average annual production of 220 million pieces. The Book of Han describes the Western Han as a time of prosperity:

The granaries in the cities and the countryside were full, and the government treasuries were running over with wealth. In the capital, the strings of cash had been stacked up by the hundreds of millions until the cords that bound them had rotted away and they could no longer be counted.

Prices reflected this abundance: millet averaged 75 cash, polished rice 140 cash per hectolitre, and a horse 4,400–4,500 cash. Hiring a labourer costs 150 cash per month, while a merchant might earn 2,000 cash per month.

Apart from the earlier Ban Liang coins, two Western Han issues explicitly denoted their weight in the inscription:

- The San Zhu (三銖; sān zhū; 'Three Zhu' = 1.95 g, 1 zhu = 0.65 g coin was issued either between 140 and 136 BCE, or between 119 and 118 BCE. Records are ambiguous, but the later date is generally preferred.
- The Wu Zhu (五銖; wǔ zhū; 'Five Zhu') – 3.25 grams first appeared in 118 BCE. This inscription endured on coins across many regimes for the next 700 years.

Wu Zhu coins are often dated precisely from moulds or find spots, though most remain undated. Western Han examples show a square top on the right-hand component of zhu; later coins round it. Only select varieties described by numismatists are listed here.

- Jun Guo Wu Zhu (郡國五銖; jùn guó wǔ zhū) (118–115 BCE): Large and heavy, with unfiled edges and sometimes a rimless reverse. Considered the earliest Wu Zhu. In 118 BCE, the Han ordered Commanderies (Jun) and Principalities (Guo) to cast 5 zhu coins with circular rims to prevent clipping for copper.
- Chi Ze Wu Zhu (赤仄五銖; chì zè wǔ zhū) (115–113 BCE): Lighter than Jun Guo, with filed edges. Records note that in 115 BCE, capital mints were instructed to produce Chi Ze coins, each worth five local ones; only these were to circulate. "Chi Ze" (Red/Shining Edge) refers to visible red copper after filing. Examples come from the tomb of Liu Sheng, Prince of Zhongshan, who died in 113 BCE.
- Shang Lin San Guan Wu Zhu (上林三官五銖; shàng lín sān guān wǔ zhū) (from 113 BCE): Named for the Three Offices of Shang Lin Park (Coinage, Copper Sorting, Price Equalisation). Central minting restricted forgery to skilled artisans, villains, or thieves. Earlier coins were to be melted and copper sent to Shang Lin. These typically feature a raised rim atop the obverse hole, with exceptional quality.

Wu Zhu production continued into later periods, often amid economic challenges.

- Wu Zhu Coins (25 CE): After Wang Mang's regime ended, the system remained disrupted. Cloth, silk, and grain supplemented coins, but cash measured wealth in large amounts (e.g., one million cash gifted to Yang Ping, 92–195 CE). Wu Zhu issues persisted alongside others until the sixth century; some tie to specific reigns/events, many do not.
- The Iron Wu Zhu: Resembles Western Han types; attributed to Gongsun Shu's Sichuan rebellion in 25 CE, where iron coins equalled one Jian Wu Wu Zhu (建武五銖; jiàn wǔ wǔ zhū). Rounded zhu head typical of Eastern Han. In 30 CE, Sichuan youths sang: "The yellow bull! The white belly! Let Wu Zhu coins return!"—mocking Wang Mang tokens and Gongsun Shu iron. Emperor Guangwu withdrew them in Jianwu 16 (40 CE), advised that national wealth rested on sound Wu Zhu policy, and reissued them.
- The Si Chu Wu Zhu (四出五銖; sì chū wǔ zhū; 'Four Corner five zhu'): Four reverse lines radiate from hole corners. Attributed to Eastern Han Emperor Ling in 186 CE; lines symbolized wealth fleeing a doomed city, foreshadowing Han's fall.
- Shu Wu Zhu (蜀五銖; shǔ wǔ zhū): Obverse Chuan (川; chuān); reverse incuse numbers 1–32. Attributed to Shu Han (221–265 CE) by Gansu finds.
- Shen Lang Wu Zhu (沈郎五銖; shén láng wǔ zhū; 'Lord Shen's'): Lacks jin in zhu. Attributed to Shen Chong of Wu House post-317 Eastern Jin founding; also Shen Chong Wu Zhu (沈充五銖; shén chōng wǔ zhū). Ballad: "Elm seeds countless press in sheets, Lord Shen's green cash line town streets"—implying small/light coins.
- Dang Liang Wu Zhu (當兩; dāng liǎng; 'Worth Two'): Large/thick, nominal 8 zhu. Attributed to Emperor Wen of Liu Song dynasty in 447, to curb malpractices.
- Tian Jian Wu Zhu: Inner obverse rim. Early Liang dynasty: money limited to capital; elsewhere, grain/cloth, south gold/silver. In Tianjian 1 (502), Emperor Wu cast rimmed Wu Zhu; also, rimless "female" coins circulated together.
- Nu Qian (女錢; nǚ qián; 'The Female Coin'): No outer rim.
- An iron version of the Wu Zhu: Four reverse radiating lines. Attributed to Emperor Wu of Liang in 523. By 535, Sichuan traders complained of stringing/transporting vast, cheap coins.
- Liang Zhu Wu Zhu (兩柱五銖; liǎng zhù wǔ zhū; 'Two Pillar'): Obverse dots above/below hole. Attributed to Emperor Yuan in 552; intended as ten ordinary coins.
- Si Zhu Wu Zhu (四柱五銖; sìzhù wǔ zhū; 'Four Pillar'): Dots on obverse/reverse. Attributed to Emperor Jing in 557; originally twenty ordinary coins, soon worth one. Similar dotted coins appear in earlier tombs.
- Chen Wu Zhu (陳五銖; chén wǔ zhū): Stout outer rim, no inner; square-topped zhu top, round bottom. Attributed to Emperor Wen from Tian Jia 3 (562); one worth ten small goose-eye coins.
- Yong Ping Wu Zhu (永平五銖; yǒng píng wǔ zhū): Long/thin characters. Attributed to Emperor Xuan during Yongping (510).
- Da Tong Wu Zhu (大統五銖; dà tǒng wǔ zhū): Stout outer rim, inner rim by wu only; straight wu crossing lines. Attributed to Emperor Wen of Western Wei, Datong (540).
- Western Wei Wu Zhu (西魏五銖; xīwèi wǔ zhū): Straight wu lines; inner rim by wu only. Previously Sui-attributed; found in Houyi tomb (Western Wei 535–556).
- Sui Wu Zhu (随五銖; suí wǔ zhū): Hourglass wu, inner rim by wu only. First cast by Emperor Wen in 581. In 583, frontiers submitted 100 cash samples; 584 forbade old coins (fines half-year salary). 1,000 weighed 4 jin 2 liang. Minting privileges to princes.
- Bai Qian Wu Zhu (白錢五銖; bái qián wǔ zhū; 'White Coin'): As above; whitish from high tin (10%) in mandated alloy (copper 60%, lead 30%, tin 10%) from 585.
- Yan Huan Wu Zhu (綖環五銖; yán huán wǔ zhū; 'Fringe or Thread Ring'): Wu Zhu with middle cut out to make two coins.
- Zao Bian Wu Zhu (鑿邊五銖; záo biān wǔ zhū; 'Chiselled Rim'): Inner portion after outer removed for thread ring. Moulds show intentional casting this way.
- E Yan (鵝眼; É yǎn; 'Goose Eye') or Ji Mu (雞目; jī mù; 'Chicken Eye'): Diminutive Wu Zhu with sharp legends; common in Western Han tombs 73–33 BCE.
- Small coins with no characters: Traditionally ascribed to Dong Zhuo (董卓; dǒngzhuō), who in 190 usurped the throne and melted nine Qin statues for coins. Possibly cast other times.

== Xin dynasty ==
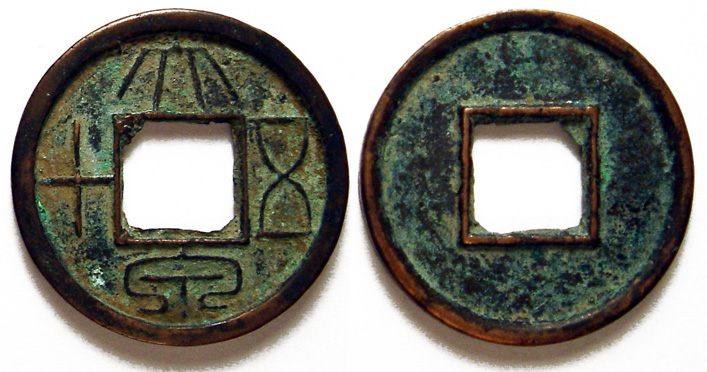
Obverse and reverse of a Da Quan Wu Shi coin.

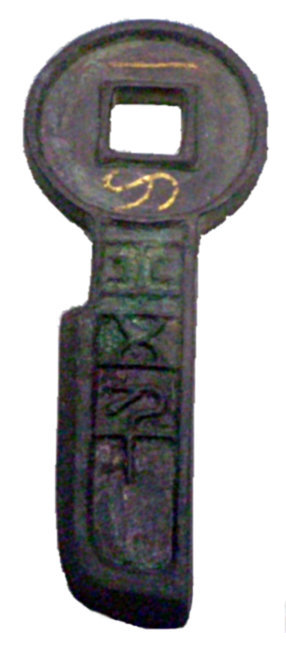
Yi Dao Ping Wu Qian

Wang Mang was a nephew of the Dowager Empress Wang. In 9 CE, he usurped the throne and founded the Xin dynasty. He introduced a number of currency reforms, which met with varying degrees of success. The first reform, in 7 CE, retained the Wu Zhu coin, but reintroduced two versions of the knife money:

- Yi Dao Ping Wu Qian (一刀平五千; yīdāo píng wǔqiān; 'One Knife Worth Five Thousand') on which the Yi Dao characters are inlaid in gold.
- Qi Dao Wu Bai (契刀五百; qì dāo wǔbǎi; 'Inscribed Knife Five Hundred')

Between 9 and 10 CE, he introduced an impossibly complex system involving tortoise shell, cowries, gold, silver, six round copper coins, and a reintroduction of the spade money in ten denominations.

- The Six Coins (9–14 CE)
  - Xiao Quan Zhi Yi (小泉直一; xiǎoquán zhí yī; 'Small Coin', 'Value One')
  - Yao Quan Yi Shi (么泉一十; yǎo quán yīshí; 'Baby Coin', 'Ten')
  - You Quan Er Shi (幼泉二十; yòu quán èrshí; 'Juvenile Coin', 'Twenty')
  - Zhong Quan San Shi (中泉三十; zhōng quán sānshí; 'Middle Coin', 'Thirty')
  - Zhuang Quan Si Shi (壯泉四十; zhuàng quán sìshí; 'Adult Coin', 'Forty')
  - Da Quan Wu Shi (大泉五十; dàquán wǔshí) is a round coin with a nominal value of fifty Wu Zhu.
- The Ten Spades (10–14 CE)
  - Xiao Bu Yi Bai (小布一百; xiǎo bù yībǎi; 'Small Spade', 'One Hundred')
  - Yao Bu Er Bai (么布二百; yǎo bù èrbǎi; 'Baby Spade', 'Two Hundred')
  - You Bu San Bai (幼布三百; yòu bù sānbǎi; 'Juvenile Spade', 'Three Hundred')
  - Xu Bu Si Bai (序布四百; xù bù sìbǎi; 'Ordered Spade', 'Four Hundred')
  - Cha Bu Wu Bai (差布五百; chà bù wǔbǎi; 'Servant Spade', 'Five Hundred')
  - Zhong Bu Liu Bai (中布六百; zhōng bù liùbǎi; 'Middle Spade', 'Six Hundred')
  - Zhuang Bu Qi Bai (壯布七百; zhuàng bù qībǎi; 'Adult Spade', 'Seven Hundred')
  - Di Bu Ba Bai (第布八百; dì bù bābǎi; 'Graduate Spade', 'Eight Hundred')
  - Ci Bu Jiu Bai (次布九百; cì bù jiǔbǎi; 'Lower Spade', 'Nine Hundred')
  - Da Bu Heng Qian (大布黃千; dà bù héng qiān; 'Large Spade', 'Weight One Thousand')

According to the History of Han:

The people became bewildered and confused, and these coins did not circulate. They secretly used Wu Zhu coins for their purchases. Wang Mang was very concerned at this and issued the following decree:

Those who dare to oppose the court system and those who dare to use Wu Zhus surreptitiously to deceive the people and equally the spirits will all be exiled to the Four Frontiers and be at the mercy of devils and demons.

The result of this was that trade and agriculture languished, and food became scarce. People went about crying in the markets and the highways, the number of sufferers being untold.

In 14 CE, all these tokens were abolished, and replaced by another type of spade coin and new round coins:

- Huo Bu (貨布; huò bù; 'Money Spade')
- Huo Quan (貨泉; huò quán; 'Wealth/Money Coin')

According to Schjöth, Wang Mang wished to displace the Wu Zhu currency of the Western Han, owing, it is said, to his prejudice to the jin (金; jīn; 'gold') radical in the character zhu (銖; zhū) of this inscription, which was a component part of the character Liu, the family name of the rulers of the House of Han, whose descendant Wang Mang had just dethroned. And so he introduced the Huo Quan currency. One of the reasons, again, that this coin circulated for several years into the succeeding dynasty was, so the chroniclers say, the fact that the character quan (泉; quán) in the inscription consisted of the two component parts bai (白; bái; 'white') and shui (水; shuǐ; 'water'), which happened to be the name of the village, Bai Shui in Henan, in which the Emperor Guang Wu, who founded the Eastern Han, was born. This circumstance lent a charm to this coin and prolonged its time of circulation. The Huo Quan did indeed continue to be minted after the death of Wang Mang – a mould dated 40 CE is known.

8 Bu Quan (布泉; bù quán; 'Spade Coin') was known later as the Nan Qian (男錢; nán qián; 'Male Cash'), from the belief that if a woman wore this on her sash, she would give birth to a boy. Eventually, Wang Mang's unsuccessful reforms provoked an uprising, and he was killed by rebels in 23 CE.

== Three Kingdoms ==
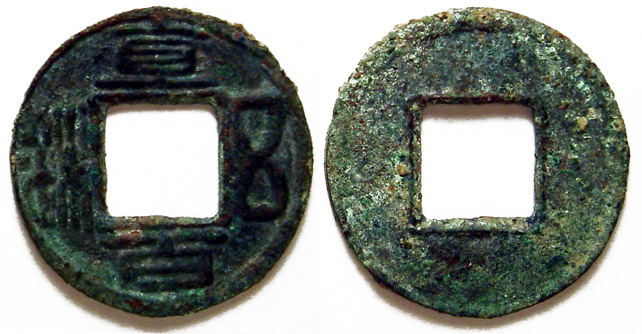
Obverse and reverse of a Zhi Bai Wu Zhu coin.

In 220 CE, the Han dynasty came to an end, and was followed by a long period of disunity and civil war, beginning with the Three Kingdoms period, which developed from the divisions within the Han dynasty. These three states were Cao Wei in northern China, Shu Han to the west, and Eastern Wu in the east. The period was the golden age of chivalry in Chinese history, as described in the historical novel Romance of the Three Kingdoms. The coinage reflected the unsettled times, with small and token coins predominating.

=== Cao Wei ===
This state only issued Wu Zhu coins.

=== Shu Han ===
The coins issued by this state were:

- Zhi Bai Wu Zhu (直百五銖; zhí bǎi wǔ zhū; 'Value One Hundred Wu Zhu') Often found with incuse characters on the reverse.
- Zhi Bai (直百; zhí bǎi; 'Value One Hundred') When Liu Bei, later ruler of Shu and one of the heroes of Romance of the Three Kingdoms, took Chengdu in Sichuan in 214 CE, he was advised to issue "value one hundred" coins to overcome the problems of maintaining his troops; hence these coins are attributed to him.
- Tai Ping Bai Qian (太平百錢; tàipíng bǎi qián; 'Taiping One Hundred Cash') – the "Taiping" inscription is regional/religious and not associated with Eastern Wu’s Taiping era (256 CE).
  1. Rev: Stars and waves pattern.
  2. Rev: Incuse characters.
  3. Rev: Plain

The Tai Ping Bai Qian coin was at first attributed to Sun Liang of Eastern Wu, who adopted a Taiping year title in 256 CE. Most of them, however, have been unearthed in Sichuan (in one instance in a tomb dated to 227 CE) together with Zhi Bai coins, which, together with the incuse marks on the reverse, indicate that they are issues of Shu Han. The fancy calligraphy and reverses of the large coins are more typical of amulets than circulating coins, and Peng seeks to associate them with the Taiping Taoists of the time.

- Zhi Yi (直一; zhí yī; 'Value One')
- Ding Ping Yi Bai (定平一百; dìngpíng yībǎi; 'Ding Ping One Hundred')

In the 1860s, a jar of small "goose eye" coins was dug up in Chengdu in Sichuan. It contained Tai Ping Bai Qian, Ding Ping Yi Bai, Zhi Bai, and Zhi Yi coins. This reinforces the supposition that all these coins are near contemporaries, issued by Shu Han.

=== Eastern Wu ===
- Da Quan Wu Bai (大泉五百; dàquán wǔbǎi; 'Large Coin Five Hundred')
- Da Quan Dang Qian (大泉當千; dàquán dāng qiān; 'Large Coin Worth a Thousand')
- Da Quan Er Qian (大泉二千; dàquán èrqiān; 'Large Coin', 'Two Thousand')
- Da Quan Wu Qian (大泉五千; dàquán wǔqiān; 'Large Coin', 'Five Thousand'): Only six specimens are known, which are all held in the museum collections of China National Museum, Shanghai Museum, and the British Museum.

According to the records, Sun Quan, the ruler of Wu, cast the Da Quan Wu Bai in 236 CE, and the Da Quan Dang Qian coins in 238 CE. The people were called upon to hand over the copper in their possession and receive back cash, and thus, illicit coining was discouraged. These are coarse coins, cast in the capital Nanking or in Hubei. In 2000, clay moulds and other casting materials for Da Quan Wu Bai coins were discovered in the Western Lake, Hangzhou.

== Jin dynasty ==
Sima Yan founded the Jin dynasty in 265 CE, and after the defeat of Eastern Wu in 280 CE, China was reunified for a while. At first, the dynasty was known as the Western Jin, with Luoyang as its capital; from 317 CE, it ruled as the Eastern Jin from Nanking. The historical records do not mention the specific casting of coins during the Jin dynasty. In the south, reductions in the weights of coins caused great price fluctuations, and cloth and grain were used as substitutes for coins. In the north, numerous independent kingdoms (The Sixteen Kingdoms) issued some interesting coins.

== Sixteen Kingdoms ==
=== Former Liang ===
- Liang Zao Xin Quan (涼造新泉; liáng zào xīnquán; 'Liang Made New Coin') is attributed to King Zhang Gui (317–376), who ruled in the north-western area.

=== Later Zhao ===
- Feng Huo (豐貨; fēng huò; 'The Coin of Abundance') has text that uses seal script. There is no rim. They were cast by Emperor Shi Le in 319, at Xiangguo (now Xingtai in Hebei) with a weight of 4 zhu. They are known as the Cash of Riches – keeping the coin about one was said to bring great wealth. However, the historical record states that the people were displeased and that in the end the coin did not circulate.

=== Cheng Han ===
- Han Xing (漢興; hàn xìng) as an inscription either right and left or above and below. In 337, Li Shou of Sichuan adopted the period title of Han Xing. This is the first recorded use of a period title on a coin. The period ended in 343.

=== Xia ===
8 Tai Xia Zhen Xing (太夏眞興; tài xiàzhēnxìng; 'Great Xia', 'Zhenxing [period]') counterwise. These were issued during the Zhenxing period (419–424) by Helian Bobo, probably at Xi'an.

== Northern and Southern dynasties ==
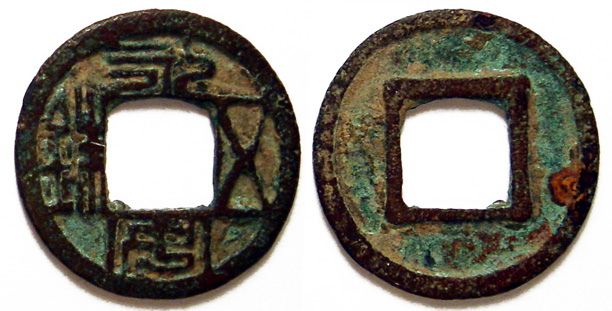
Obverse and reverse of a Yong An Wu Zhu coin.

The North and South dynasties era was another long period of disunity and strife. The north and south of China were each ruled by two separate successions of dynasties. During this period, coin inscriptions other than (nominal) weights, such as names or year titles, were introduced, although the Wu Zhu coin was still issued. Seal script remained the norm for inscriptions, and some coins of highly regarded calligraphy were produced. However, the general coinage was of a very poor quality. In 465, permission was granted for the people to mint coins. A thousand of these "goose eye" coins, which resulted, made a pile less than three inches (76 mm) high. There were others, still worse, called "Fringe Rim" coins, which would not sink in water and would break in one's hand. In the market, people would not bother counting them, but would pick them up by the handful. A peck of rice sold for 10,000 of these. Reforms by Emperor Ming from 465 onwards had only a limited success in improving the quality of the coinage.

=== Southern dynasties ===
==== Song ====
- Si Zhu (四銖; sì zhū; 'Four Zhu') No inner rims on obverse. Issued by Emperor Wen in 430, from the capital at Nanking. A Coinage Office was established under the Chamberlain for Palace Revenues.
- Xiao Jian (孝建; xiào jiàn; 'Xiaojian period') with the reverse: Si Zhu (四銖; sì zhū; 'Four Zhu') A poor coin, with many variations. Issued by Emperor Xiao from 454. Actual weight nearer 2 zhu. Withdrawn by the Emperor Ming in 467.
- Jing He (景和; jǐng hé; '[Jing He period title]')
- Yong Guang (永光; '[Yong Guang period title]')
- Liang Zhu (兩銖; 'Two Zhu')

The last three small coins, weighing only 2 zhu, were all issued by Emperor Fei in 465. As the Jinghe and Yongguang periods only lasted for a few months, these coins are very rare. The Song capital was at Nanking.

==== Liang ====
- Tai Qing Feng Le (太清豐樂; tài qīng fēng lè; 'Tai Qing', 'Prosperous and Happy') are attributed to the Tai Qing period (547–549) of Emperor Wu. A hoard was discovered in Jiangsu containing 4,000 Tai Qing Feng Le coins with various other sorts of coins, showing that this is not an amulet as had been claimed by some authorities.

==== Chen ====
- Tai Huo Liu Zhu (太貨六銖; tài huò liù zhū; 'The Large Coin Six Zhu') were issued by Emperor Xuan in 579. At first, the coin was equivalent to ten Wu Zhus. Later, the value was changed to one, and the contemporary saying "They cried before the Emperor, their arms akimbo" is said to refer to the discontent among the people caused by this. The seal character for liu suggests the "arms akimbo" posture. The coin was withdrawn in 582 when the Emperor died, and Wu Zhus were adopted. The Chen capital was Nanking.

=== Northern dynasties ===
==== Northern Wei ====
- Tai He Wu Zhu (太和五銖; tài hé wǔ zhū; 'Taihe [period] Wu Zhu'): Although the Northern Wei had been established in 386, its Turkish and Mongolian tribes had retained a nomadic way of life with no need for money until 495, when Emperor Xiao Wen issued this coin, probably at the capital Datong in Shanxi.
- Yong An Wu Zhu (永安五銖; yǒng'ān wǔ zhū; 'Yong An [period] Wu Zhu') coins were first issued in the autumn of the second year of Yongan (529) by Emperor Xiao Zhuang. It is said that they continued to be cast until 543 under the Eastern and Western Wei dynasties. During the Eastern Wei dynasty, private coins with nicknames such as Yongzhou Green-red, Liangzhou Thick, Constrained Cash, Auspicious Cash, Heyang Rough, Heavenly Pillar, and Red Halter circulated, all possibly Yong An Wu Zhus.

==== Northern Qi ====
- Chang Ping Wu Zhu (常平五銖; chángpíng wǔ zhū; 'The Constant and Regular Wu Zhu') were cast by Emperor Wen Xuan in 553. They are finely made. The Northern Qi capital was Linzhang in Hebei. Under the Northern Qi, there was an Eastern and a Western Coinage Region, under the Chamberlain for Palace Revenues. Each Regional Director supervised 3 or 4 Local Services.

==== Northern Zhou ====
- Bu Quan (布泉; bù quán; 'Spade Coin') were issued in 561 by Emperor Wu of the Northern Zhou dynasty. One was to be worth five Wu Zhus. To distinguish this coin from the Bu Quan of Wang Mang—the stroke in the middle of quan is continuous. They were withdrawn in 576.
- Wu Xing Da Bu (五行大布; wǔháng dà bù; 'The Large Coin of the Five Elements [metal', 'wood', 'water', 'fire', 'and earth]') were issued in 574 by Emperor Wu. They were intended to be worth ten Bu Quans. Illegal coining soon produced specimens of a reduced weight and the authorities banned the use of this coin in 576. This inscription is frequently found on amulets.
- Yong Tong Wan Guo (永通萬國; yǒng tōng wànguó; 'Everlasting Circulation in Ten Thousand Kingdoms') were issued in 579 by Emperor Xuan. The nominal weight was 12 zhu, and the coin was meant to be equivalent to ten Wu Xing coins.

The above coins, the "Northern Zhou Three Coins", are written in the Yu Zhu (jade chopstick) style of calligraphy, which is greatly admired.

=== 3 and 4 Zhu cash coins attributed to this period ===
3 and 4 Zhu coins are a small group of square and round coins which do not always have a hole in the middle. They are usually attributed to the time of the Southern and Northern dynasties. This was an unsettled period which produced some very poor coinage. The obverse inscriptions give a weight of 3 or 4 zhu. The reverse inscriptions appear to be place names.

Square shape:

Obverse inscription	Reverse inscription	Image
三朱 (San Zhu)	Blank	
四朱 (Si Zhu)	Blank	
四朱 (Si Zhu)	四朱 (Si Zhu)	
四朱 (Si Zhu)	Unknown; Peng Xinwei proposes that this inscription reads "Yan Xiang".	
四朱 (Si Zhu)	吕 (Lü)	
四朱 (Si Zhu)	東阿 (Dong A)	
四朱 (Si Zhu)	姑幕 (Gu Mu)	
四朱 (Si Zhu)	定襄 (Ding Xiang)	
四朱 (Si Zhu)	高柳 (Gao Liu)	
四朱 (Si Zhu)	陽丘 (Yang Qiu)	
四朱 (Si Zhu)	菑 (Zi)	
四朱 (Si Zhu)	騶 (Zou)	
四朱 (Si Zhu)	濮陽 (Pu Yang)	
淳于四朱 (Chun Yu Si Zhu)	Blank	
臨菑四朱 (Lin Zi Si Zhu)	Blank	

Round coins with a round hole:

Obverse inscription	Reverse inscription	Image
四朱 (Si Zhu)	Blank	
四朱 (Si Zhu)	四朱 (Si Zhu)	
四朱 (Si Zhu)	安平 (An Ping)	
下菜四朱 (Xia Cai Si Zhu)	Blank	
宜陽四朱 (Yi Yang Si Zhu)	Blank	
臨朐四朱 (Lin Qu Si Zhu)	Blank	

== Sui dynasty ==
China was reunified under the Sui dynasty (581–618). Under this short-lived dynasty, many reforms were initiated that led to the subsequent success of the Tang dynasty. The only coin associated with the Sui is a Wu Zhu coin. Additional mints were set up in various prefectures, typically with five furnaces each. Cash was frequently checked for quality by the officials. However, after 605, private coining again caused a deterioration of the coinage.

== Tang dynasty ==
=== Tang issues ===
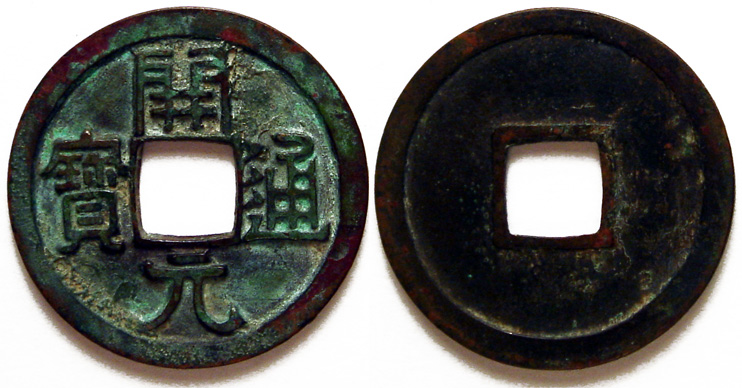
Obverse and reverse of a Kai Yuan Tong Bao coin.

Kai Yuan Tong Bao (開元通寶; kāiyuán tōng bǎo; 'The Inaugural Currency') were the main coin issued by the Tang. It was cast for most of the dynasty, a period of nearly 300 years. It was first issued by the Emperor Gao Zu in the autumn of the 4th year of the Wu De period (August 621). Its diameter was to be 8 fen. The weight was set at 2.4 zhu, ten to the liang. 1,000 coins weighed 6 jin 4 liang. The legend was written by the famous calligrapher Ouyang Xun in a much-admired mixture of the Bafen and Li (official or clerkly) styles of writing. This is the first to include the phrase tong bao, used on many subsequent coins. The inscription was used by other regimes in later periods; such coins can be distinguished from Tang coins by their workmanship. Minting and copper extraction were centrally controlled, and private casting was punishable by death. For the first time, we find regulations giving the prescribed coinage alloy: 83% copper, 15% lead, and 2% tin. Previously, the percentages used seem to have been on an ad hoc basis. Actual analyses show rather less copper than this.

A crescent-shaped mark is often found on the reverse of Kai Yuans. Folk legends attribute this to a fingernail mark from Empress Wende or Wu Zetian on a wax model, but numismatic evidence confirms the marks were a mint control system for production batches.

At first, mints were set up in Luoyang in Henan, and also in Peking, Chengdu, Bingzhou (Taiyuan in Shanxi), and then Guilin in Guangxi. Minting rights were also granted to some princes and officials. By 660, deterioration of the coinage due to forgery had become a problem. The regulations were reaffirmed in 718, and forgeries suppressed. In 737, the first commissioner with overall responsibility for casting was appointed. In 739, ten mints were recorded, with a total of 89 furnaces casting some 327,000 strings of cash a year. 123 liang of metal were needed to produce a string of coins weighing 100 liang. In the late 740s, skilled artisans were employed for casting, rather than conscripted peasants. Despite these measures, the coinage continued to deteriorate. In 808, a ban on hoarding coins was proclaimed. This was repeated in 817. Regardless of the rank of a person, they could not hold more than 5,000 strings of cash. Cash balances exceeding this amount had to be expended within two months to purchase goods. This was an attempt to compensate for the lack of cash in circulation. By 834, mint output had fallen to 100,000 strings a year, mainly due to the shortage of copper. Forgeries using lead and tin alloys were produced.

In 845, in the Huichang period, the Emperor Wu Zong, a fervent follower of Taoism, destroyed the Buddhist monasteries and used the copper bells, gongs, incense burners and statues to cast coins in various localities. These local mints were under the control of the provincial governors. The New Tang History states that Li Shen, governor of Huainan province, requested that the empire might cast coins bearing the name of the prefecture in which they were cast, and this was agreed. These coins with mint names on the reverses, known as Huichang Kai Yuans, are of poor workmanship and size compared with the early Kai Yuans. The mint names on the reverse are provincial prefecture abbreviations (e.g., 京 = Chang’an, 洛 = Luoyang). However, when Emperor Xuanzong ascended to the throne the next year, this policy was reversed, and the new coins were recast to make Buddhist statues.

Archaeological discoveries have assisted numismatists in dating various varieties of the Kai Yuan more closely. Other Tang dynasty coins are:

- Qian Feng Quan Bao (乾封泉寶; qián fēng quán bǎo) were cast by the Emperor Gao Zong (649–683) in 666. In an attempt to overcome a shortage of copper, one of the Qian Feng coins was to be equivalent to ten old coins, although its weight of 2.4 zhu was the same as a one cash coin. This led to extensive forgery, and the coin was withdrawn after a year.
- Qian Yuan zhong bao (乾元重寶; qián yuán zhòng bǎo) were issued under the direction of Wu Qi (Wǔ Qí), the Tang finance and mint commissioner, during the reign of Emperor Suzong (756–762) to pay the army fighting against the An Lushan rebels. Coins of the first issue, in 758, were the equivalent of 10 ordinary cash. Each coin weighed 1.6 qian. The second issue, from 759, was of larger coins, one of which was to be the equivalent of 50 cash. These coins have a double rim on the reverse and are known as the Zhong Lun (Heavy Wheel) cash. Their weight was twice that of the 10 cash coins. After widespread forgery led to hundreds of executions (foreshadowing similar events in the Xianfeng period), the large Qian Yuan coins were devalued to 30 cash. In 762, the smaller coins were devalued to 2 cash, and the Heavy Wheel cash to 3 cash. Small Qian Yuans, worth one Kai Yuan, were also issued.

=== Xinjiang issues ===
Judging by their find spots, these coin were cast by the local government in the Kuche area of Xinjiang in around 760–780.

- Da Li yuan bao. (大曆元寶; dà lì yuánbǎo)
- Da (大; dà) is a degenerate form of the above, but only has the da included.
- Yuan (元; yuán) is similar to the above coin; however, it has only the character yuan included.
- Jian Zhong tong bao (建中通寶; jiàn zhōng tōng bǎo) The Jian Zhong Period was 780–83.
- Zhong (中; zhōng) above the hole. A degenerate form of the above.

=== Tang rebels ===
In 755, a revolt started in the north-west of China. The capital, Luoyang, was taken, and the Emperor fled to Sichuan. One of the rebels, Shi Siming, issued coins at Luoyang from 758. Shi was killed in 761, and the revolt was eventually suppressed in 763 with the help of foreign troops.

- De Yi yuan bao (得壹元寶; de yī yuánbǎo; 'Obtain Unity') has the inscription De Yi, which also implies "last for one year". They were felt to be inauspicious, and were changed to Shun Tian (the period title) in 759.
- Shun Tian yuan bao (順天元寶; shùn tiān yuánbǎo)

== Five Dynasties and Ten Kingdoms ==
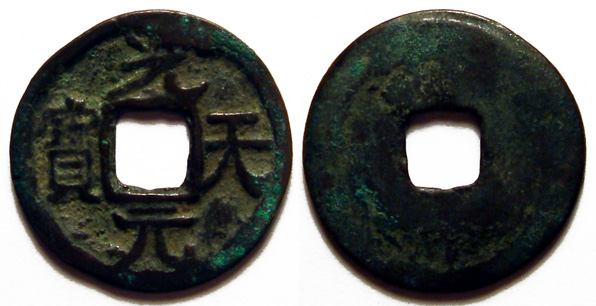
Obverse and reverse of a Guang Tian Yuan Bao coin from the Former Shu.

After the collapse of the Tang in 907, another period of disunity ensued, known as the Five Dynasties and Ten Kingdoms period. Five officially recognised dynasties ruled consecutively in the north (with capitals at Kaifeng or Luoyang in Henan), while ten different kingdoms held sway at different times in the south. A shortage of copper made it difficult to produce an adequate supply of coins. In 955, an Edict banned the holding of bronze utensils:

From now on, except for court objects, weapons, official objects and mirrors, and cymbals, bells and chimes in temples and monasteries, all other bronze utensils are banned ... Those who hoard more than 5 jin, no matter how much the amount, will be executed. Those who abetted them will be exiled for two years, followed by labour service for one year. Those around them will suffer 100 strokes of the cane. Informers will be rewarded with 30 strings of cash.

The South enjoyed somewhat better political and economic conditions and saw an advance in trade. A great variety of coinage, including large and base metal coins, was issued in this area.

=== Five Dynasties ===
==== Later Liang ====
- Kai Ping tong bao (開平通寶; kāipíng tōng bǎo) and also a Kai Ping yuan bao coins could have been issued by Zhu Wen when he overthrew the Tang in 907. However, only a few specimens of each coin are known, and one of each is shown in the China National Museum and the China History Museum. Some authorities doubt their authenticity.

==== Later Tang ====
- Tian Cheng yuan bao (天成元寶; tiānchéng yuánbǎo) were issued by Emperor Ming in the Tiancheng period (926–929).

==== Later Jin ====
- Tian Fu yuan bao (天福元寶; tiānfú yuánbǎo) were issued by Emperor Gao Zong in the Tianfu period from 938. From 939, private casting was permitted for a few months, resulting in coins of adulterated alloy.

==== Later Han ====
- Han Yuan tong bao (漢元通寶; hàn yuán tōng bǎo) coin's pattern is based on the Kai Yuan. In 948, during the reign of Emperor Gao Zu, the President of the Department of Imperial Feasts requested permission to set up a mint in the capital (Kaifeng, Henan). There is no specific record of casting Han Yuans.

==== Later Zhou ====
- Zhou Yuan tong bao (周元通寶; zhōuyuán tōng bǎo) coins were issued by Emperor Shi Zong from 955. The pattern is also based on the Kai Yuan coin. They were cast from melted-down bronze Buddhist ritual objects (bells, gongs, incense burners) from temples. When reproached for this, the Emperor uttered a cryptic remark to the effect that the Buddha would not mind this sacrifice. It is said that the Emperor himself supervised the casting at the many large furnaces behind the palace. The coins have amuletic properties because they were made from Buddhist statues, and are particularly effective in midwifery – hence the many later-made imitations.

=== Ten Kingdoms ===
==== Former Shu ====
Issued by Wang Jian (907–918):

- Yong Ping yuan bao (永平元寶; yǒng píng yuánbǎo)
- Tong Zheng yuan bao (通正元寶; tōng zhèng yuánbǎo)
- Tian Han yuan bao (天漢元寶; tiānhàn yuánbǎo)
- Guang Tian yuan bao (光天元寶; guāng tiān yuánbǎo)

Issued by Wang Zongyan, son of Wang Jian (919–925):

- Qian De yuan bao (乾德元寶; qián dé yuánbǎo)
- Xian Kang yuan bao (咸康元寶; xián kāng yuánbǎo)

The coins of the Wang family were often of a very poor quality. Wang Jian began his career as a village thief; he enlisted as a soldier, rose through the ranks, and by 901 was virtually an independent ruler, with his capital at Chengdu in Sichuan. His regime provided a peaceful haven for artists and poets.

==== Min ====
Issued by Wang Shenzhi:

- Kai Yuan tong bao (開元通寶; kāiyuán tōng bǎo) have a large dot above on the reverse side. They are made of iron and date from 922. The same coin cast in bronze is extremely rare.
- Kai Yuan tong bao (開元通寶; kāiyuán tōng bǎo) have the character Min (閩; mǐn) on the reverse. They are from the Fujian region and made of lead.
- Kai Yuan tong bao (開元通寶; kāiyuán tōng bǎo) have the character Fu (福; fú) on the reverse in reference to Fuzhou. They are made of lead.

In 916, Wang Shenzhi, King of Min, minted a small lead Kai Yuan coin in Ninghua County of Dingzhou Prefecture in Fujian Province, where deposits of lead had been discovered. The lead coins circulated together with copper coins.

Issued by Wang Yanxi:

- Yong Long tong bao (永隆通寶; yǒnglóng tōng bǎo) have the character Min (閩; mǐn) on the reverse and come from the Fujian region. There is a crescent below. It is made of iron and dates from 942. One of these large Yong Long coins was worth 10 small coins and 100 lead coins. A string of 500 of these poorly made Min iron coins was popularly called a kao ('a manacle').

Issued by Wang Yanzheng:

- Tian De tong bao (天德通寶; tiān dé tōng bǎo) are made of iron. When Wang Yanzheng was proclaimed Emperor, he changed the name of the kingdom to Yin, but later restored the name of Min. One of these iron coins, which was cast in 944, was worth 100 ordinary cash.

==== Chu ====
Supreme Commander Ma Yin:

- Tian Ce Fu Bao (天策府寶; tiān cè fǔ bǎo) are made of iron. Ma Yin, originally a carpenter, was given the rank of Supreme Commander of Tiance, Hunan, by Emperor Zhu Wen of the Later Liang, and minted this coin in 911 to commemorate the event. Ma Yin later became King Wumu of Chu.
- Qian Feng Quan Bao (乾封泉寶; qiān fēng quán bǎo) are made of iron. According to the histories, because there was much lead and iron in Hunan, Ma Yin took the advice of his minister Gao Yu to cast lead and iron coins at Changsha in 925. One of these was worth ten copper cash, and its circulation was confined to Changsha. Merchants traded in these coins, to the benefit of the State. In 2000, a hoard of over 3,000 of these coins was found near Changsha. Extremely rare bronze specimens are also known.
- Qian Yuan zhong bao (乾元重寶; qiān yuán zhòng bǎo) bears an inscription that is also found on Tang coins. This small lead coin is thought to have been issued by the Chu kingdom. Similar bronze coins are sometimes attributed to Ma Yin, but could be funerary items.

==== Later Shu ====
- Da Shu tong bao (Great Shu currency) (大蜀通寶; dà shǔ tōng bǎo) are attributed to Meng Zhixiang when he became Emperor Gao Zu of Shu in Chengdu in 934. He died three months later. Despite its rarity, some say this coin continued to be cast by his son, Meng Chang, until 937.
- Guang Zheng tong bao (廣政通寶; guǎng zhèngtōng bǎo) are made of bronze and iron. The bronze coins were cast by Meng Chang from the beginning of this period, 938. In 956, iron coins began to be cast to cover additional military expenses. They circulated until 963.

==== Southern Tang ====
Emperor Yuan Zong (Li Jing) (943–961):

- Bao Da yuan bao (保大元寶; bǎo dà yuán bǎo) has on the reverse the character tian above. They are made of iron and date between 943 and 957. There is also an extremely rare bronze example of this coin.
- Yong Tong Quan Huo (永通泉貨; yǒng tōng quán huò) were produced after 959. Li Jing was short of funds for his army at that time. His minister Zhong Mo obtained permission to cast large coins, one equal to ten, with this inscription. In 964, the coin was withdrawn when Zhong Mo incurred the displeasure of the Emperor.
- Tang Guo tong bao (唐國通寶; tang guó tōng bǎo) are written in seal, li, and regular script. They date from 959.
- Da Tang tong bao (大唐通寶; dà táng tōng bǎo) are written in li script and date from 959.

Emperor Li Yu (961–978):

- Kai Yuan tong bao (開元通寶; kāiyuán tōng bǎo) are written in li script and date from 961.

Distinguished from Tang period Kai Yuan by the broader rims, and the characters being in less deep relief.

In the second year of Qiande (961), Li Yu ascended the throne, and the resources of the country being exhausted, his minister Han Xizai obtained permission to cast coins. These were on the Kai Yuan model, but in seal writing devised by the scholar Xu Xuan. This coin was slightly larger than the old Kai Yuans, had broader rims, and was convenient for both the government and the people.

- Da Qi tong bao (大齊通寶; dà qí tōng bǎo; 'Great Qi currency') were said to have been cast in 937 by the Prince of Qi or by the founder of the Southern Tang with the original name of the Tang kingdom. Only two specimens were known, and these have now disappeared.

==== Southern Han ====
- Kai Ping yuan bao (開平元寶; kāipíng yuánbǎo) were made from lead. Attributed to Liu Yan (Emperor Lie Zu) of the Southern Han Kingdom, cast c.917–920 to commemorate the Later Liang period title (907–910). Excavated in Guangdong.

Emperor Lie Zu (Liu Yan) (917–942):

- Qian Heng tong bao (乾亨通寶; gān hēngtōng bǎo)
- Qian Heng zhong bao (乾亨重寶; gān hēng zhòng bǎo) were made from bronze and lead.

In 917, Liu Yan proclaimed himself Emperor of a dynasty at first called the Great Yue, then the Han, and set up his capital at Canton, which he renamed Xingwangfu.

==== Crude lead coins ====
Attributed to the Southern Han/Chu area (900–971):

- Kai Yuan tong bao (開元通寶; kāiyuán tōng bǎo) are based on Tang dynasty coins. They have a local style with numerous reverse inscriptions – apparently series numbers. There is a great variety of such coins; some have crescents on the reverse. The Kai character sometimes looks like yong (永; yǒng). Characters and legends were often reversed because the incompetent workmen had not mastered the art of engraving in negative to make the moulds. Some specimens have meaningless characters.

Wu Wu (五五), Wu Wu Wu (五五五), Wu Wu Wu Wu (五五五五), Wu Zhu (五朱), and Kai Yuan Wu Wu (開元五五) coins are typical of the hybrid inscriptions formed by combinations of inappropriate characters. They also have series numbers on the reverse.

In 924, it was reported: In the shops and the markets, control of silk and money has resulted in the circulation of small lead coins which we readily find in great quantities; they all come from south of the [Yangtze] river, whence the merchants transport them here surreptitiously. In 929, the Chu authorities fixed the value of a lead coin as 1/100 of a bronze coin. In 962, it was decreed that the lead coins should circulate in towns, and copper coins outside of them. Those contravening this risked the death penalty.

Nearly all the coin hoards of this period are of lead coins found in towns, e.g. the Guangfu Road, Guangzhou hoard of 2,000 coins. It is clear that most of these coins were made unofficially by the merchants or the people.

Recently, many inventions, purporting to belong to this series, have appeared on the market.

==== Youzhou region (900–914) ====
From 822, the Youzhou area (within modern Hebei) enjoyed virtual independence from the rest of the empire. At the end of the ninth century, the Regional Commandant of You Zhou was Liu Rengong, succeeded by his son Liu Shouguang from 911. The histories say that Liu Rengong minted iron coins. He is also said to have ordered his subordinates to collect up all [old?] bronze coins and bring them to Da'an Mountain where he buried them in a cave. When they had all been hidden away, he killed the workmen and covered over the entrance. The coins below have been found together in the north of China. Opinion on their attribution is divided. Although Yong An was a Xia dynasty period title, these coins appear to be the result of unregulated minting, which seems appropriate for the regime of the Liu family.

- Yong An Yi Shi (永安一十; yǒng'ān yīshí)
- Yong An Yi Bai (永安一百; yǒng'ān yībǎi)
- Yong An Wu Bai (永安五百; yǒng'ān wǔbǎi)
- Yong An Yi Qian (永安一千; yǒng'ān yīqiān)

The above are found in bronze and iron.

- Wu Zhu (五銖; wǔ zhū) are made from iron.
- Huo Bu (貨布; huò bù) with the reverse: San Bai (三百; sānbǎi; 'Three hundred').
- Shun Tian yuan bao. (順天元寶; shùn tiān yuánbǎo) are made from iron.

These poorly made coins are imitations of coins of previous regimes and are attributed to the Youzhou region.

== Song dynasty ==
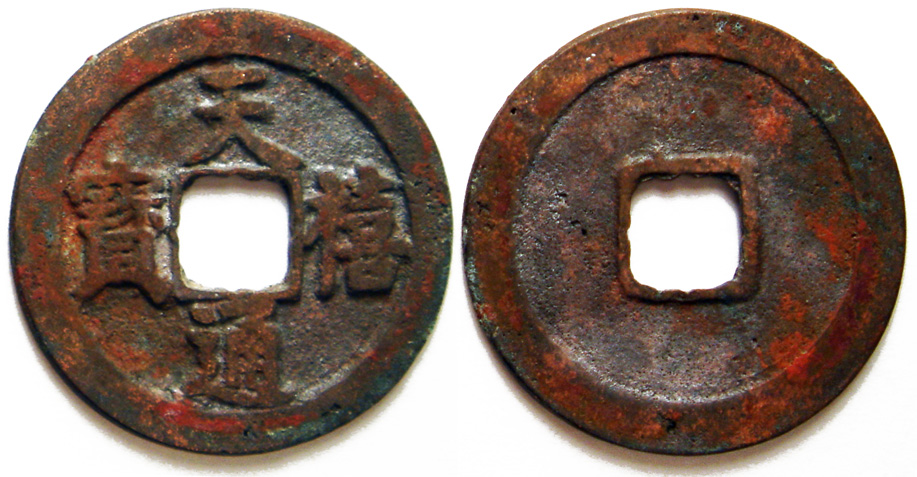
Obverse and reverse of a Tian Xi Tong Bao coin.

In 960, General Zhao Kuangyin had the throne thrust upon him by mutinous officers. He allowed the Later Zhou family to retire peacefully and established the Song dynasty. Coins were the primary unit of account in the Song monetary system. Cloth had reverted to the status of a commodity. Aided by the exploitation of new copper mines, cash coins were produced on a large scale. By the Yuanfeng period (1078–1085), casting from 17 different mints produced over five million strings a year of bronze coins. Most mints produced 200,000 strings per year; the largest, Shao Zhou, was located in Guangdong, where there was a large copper mine. It produced 800,000 strings a year. In 1019, the coinage alloy was set at 64% copper, 27% lead, and 9% tin. This indicates a nearly 20% reduction in copper content relative to the Tang dynasty Kai Yuan coin.

With so much official coinage available, private coining was generally not a serious problem. Song coins were used over much of Asia, especially in Korea, Japan, Annam, and Indonesia. Hordes of Song coins are often found in these countries.

A wide variety of ordinary cash coin types was produced. The inscription was nearly always changed when the period title was changed. Seal, li, regular, running, and "grass" styles of writing were all used at various times. Many inscriptions were written by the ruling Emperor, resulting in some of the most admired and analysed calligraphy on coins. In addition, inscriptions could use yuan bao (Chinese: 元寶; pinyin: yuánbǎo) or tong bao (Chinese: 通寶; pinyin: tōng bǎo), increasing the number of variations possible. Large coins which used zhong bao (Chinese: 重寶; pinyin: zhòng bǎo) were also issued in a variety of sizes and nominal denominations, usually devalued soon after issue.

A feature of Northern Song coinage is the sets of dui qian (Chinese: 對錢; pinyin: duì qián; lit. 'Pair Coins'). This means the simultaneous use of two or three different calligraphic styles on coins of the same period title, which are otherwise identical in size of hole, width of rim, thickness, size and position of the characters and alloy. One can assume that these congruences arose from the workmanship of the different mints, but no attributions have yet been proposed.

From the beginning of the dynasty, iron coins were extensively used in present-day Sichuan and Shaanxi, where copper was not readily available. Between 976 and 984, a total of 100,000 strings of iron coins were produced in Fujian as well, but iron coin production was discontinued with the discovery of copper deposits. In 993, for paying the land tax, one iron coin was equal to one bronze coin; for the salary of clerks and soldiers, one bronze coin was equal to five iron coins, but in trade, ten iron coins were needed for one bronze coin. In 1005, four mints in Sichuan produced over 500,000 strings of iron coins a year. This declined to 210,000 strings by the beginning of the Qingli period (1041). At this time, the mints were ordered to cast 3 million strings of iron cash to meet military expenses in Shaanxi. However, by 1056, casting was down to 100,000 strings a year, and in 1059, minting was halted for 10 years in Jiazhou and Qiongzhou, leaving only Xingzhou producing 30,000 strings a year.

During the Xining period (from 1068), minting was increased, and by the Yuanfeng period (from 1078), it was reported that there were nine iron coin mints, three in Sichuan and six in Shaanxi, producing over a million strings a year. Thereafter, output declined gradually.

=== Emperor Taizu (960–976) ===
- Song Yuan tong bao. (Chinese: 宋元通寶; pinyin: sòng yuán tōng bǎo). Written in li script. The inscription is based on the Kai Yuan coin. It has a nominal weight of 1 qian. Various dots and crescents are found on the reverse. It was first cast in 960 and then until the end of Tai Zu's reign. Casting of iron coins started at Baizhangxian, Yazhou, in Sichuan, from 970. Ten furnaces cast 9,000 strings a year.

=== Emperor Taizong (976–997) ===
- Tai Ping tong bao (Chinese: 太平通寶; pinyin: tài píng tōng bǎo) (976–989). Written in li script. Various dots and crescents are found on the reverse. There are also iron coins. The small iron coins come from Sichuan, and 10 were equivalent to one bronze coin. The large iron coin has a large dot above on the reverse. This coin was cast at Jianzhou, Fujian, in 983, and was intended to be equivalent to 3 bronze coins.

No coins were issued with the Yongxi and Duangong era titles (984–989).

- Chun Hua yuan bao (Chinese: 淳化元寶; pinyin: chún huà yuánbǎo) (990–994). Written in regular, running, and grass script. There are also small and large iron coins. They have a nominal value of 10. In 991, 20,000 iron coins were needed in the market for one roll of silk. Permission was requested to alter the casting to Value Ten coins in the Imperial Script pattern. In one year, only 3,000 strings were cast. They were not considered convenient, so casting was stopped.
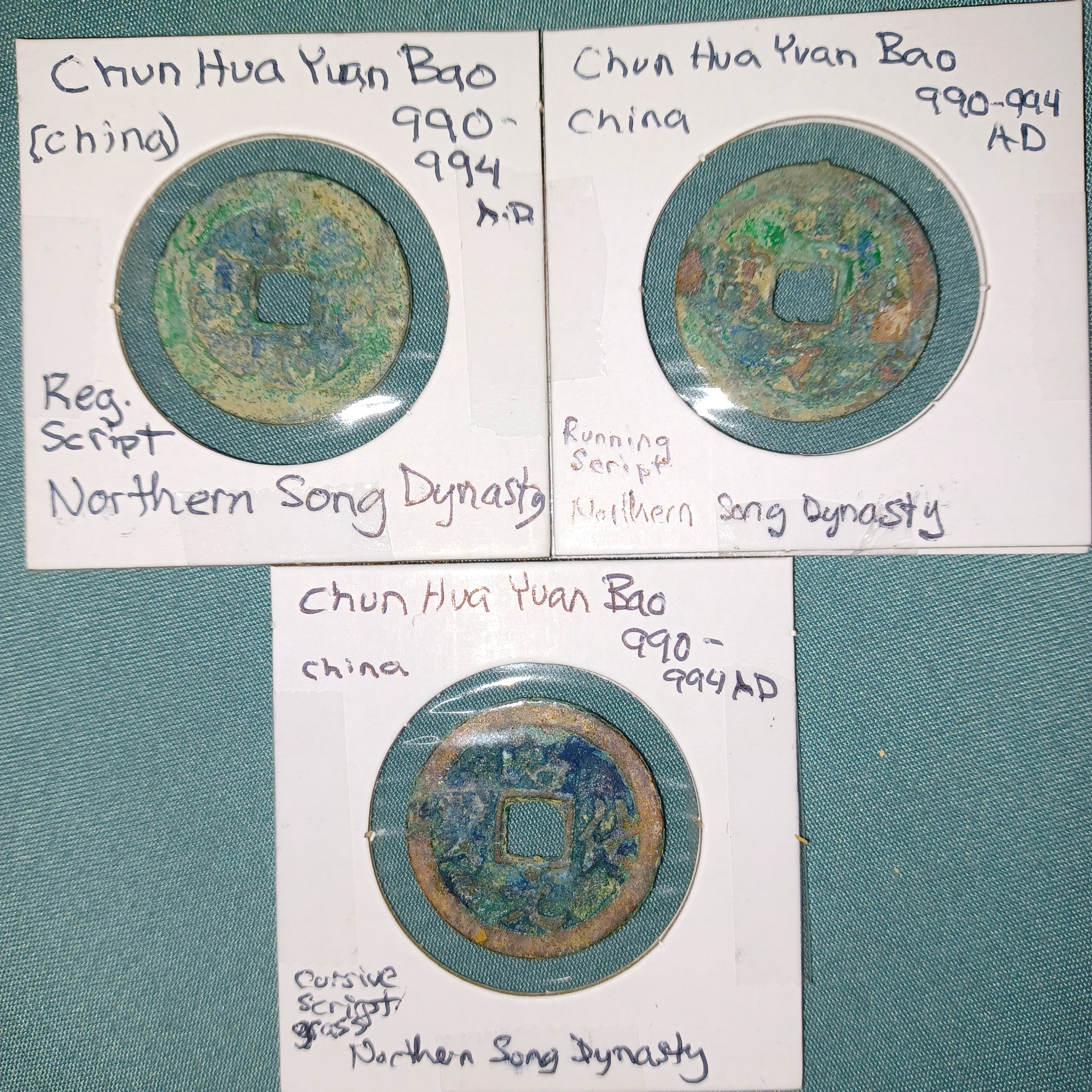
  Cash: Chún Huà yuán bǎo
- Zhi Dao yuan bao (Chinese: 至道元寶; pinyin: zhì dào yuánbǎo) (995–997). Written in regular, running, and grass script. During this reign, there was an increase in the number of mints in operation. The inscriptions were written by the Emperor Tai Zong himself, who was a noted scholar and calligrapher. The weight of 2,400 small coins was set at 15 jin, so one weighed 1 qian.

=== Emperor Zhenzong (998–1022) ===
- Xian Ping yuan bao (Chinese: 咸平元寶; pinyin: xián píng yuánbǎo) (998–1003). Written in regular script. They are found in both bronze and iron.
- Jing De yuan bao (Chinese: 景德元寶; pinyin: jǐng dé yuánbǎo) (1004–07). Written in regular script. They are made of bronze, Iron with Value Two, or Iron with Value Ten. The large iron coins were minted at Jiazhou and Qiongzhou in Sichuan in 1005. They weighed 4 qian each (1 qian = 3.73 grams).
- Xiang Fu yuan bao (Chinese: 祥符元寶; pinyin: xiáng fú yuánbǎo) (1008–1016). Written in regular script. They are made of bronze or iron. They come in medium and large sizes. The large iron coins were cast from 1014 to 1016 in Yizhou, Sichuan. Their nominal value was 10 cash and weighed 3.2 qian.
- Xiang Fu tong bao (Chinese: 祥符通寶; pinyin: xiáng fú tōng bǎo) (1008–1016). Written in regular script.
- Tian Xi tong bao (Chinese: 天禧通寶; pinyin: tiān xǐ tōng bǎo) (1017–1022). Written in regular script. They are made of bronze or iron. At this time, there were copper coin mints at Yongping in Jiangxi, Yongfeng in Anhui, Guangning in Jiangxi, Fengguo in Fujian, and in the capital Kaifeng City. There were also three iron coin mints in Sichuan.

No coins were produced with the Qianxing era title, which only lasted one year, 1022.

=== Emperor Renzong (1022–1063) ===
- Tian Sheng yuan bao (Chinese: 天聖元寶; pinyin: tiān shèng yuánbǎo) (1023–1031). Written in seal, regular and li script.
- Ming Dao yuan bao (Chinese: 明道元寶; pinyin: míngdào yuánbǎo) (1032–1033). Written in seal and regular script. There are iron coins with this inscription.
- Jing You yuan bao (Chinese: 景祐元寶; pinyin: jǐng yòu yuánbǎo) (1034–1038). Written in seal and regular script. There are both small and large iron coins.
- Huang Song tong bao (Chinese: 皇宋通寶; pinyin: huáng sòng tōng bǎo) (1039–1054) use seal and regular script, and have many variations. They are made of iron and have two forms with either small or large characters. The small character iron coins are associated with casting in Shaanxi and Shanxi in the Qing Li period (from 1044). The large character iron coins are associated with Sichuan mints.

The histories say that the Huang Song coin was cast in Baoyuan 2–1039. As it is rather common, and there are no bronze small cash from the next three periods, it appears to have been issued for longer than one year.

- Kang Ding yuan bao (Chinese: 康定元寶; pinyin: kāngdìng yuánbǎo) (1040). Written in li script. They are made of iron and come in both small and medium sizes.
- Qing Li zhong bao (Chinese: 慶歷重寶; pinyin: qìnglì zhòng bǎo) (1041–1048). Written in regular script. There are two forms: large bronze coins and large iron coins. The Qing Li large bronze coins, intended to be worth 10 cash, were cast in Jiangnan to fund the war with the Western Xia. Iron coins were cast in Shanxi and other prefectures. The large coins caused prices to leap up, and both public and private interests suffered. In 1048, the large iron coins were devalued to 3 iron cash.
- Zhi He yuan bao (Chinese: 至和元寶; pinyin: zhì hé yuánbǎo) (1054–1055). Written in seal, regular, and li script.
- Zhi He tong bao (Chinese: 至和通寶; pinyin: zhì hé tōng bǎo) (1054–1055). Written in seal, regular, and li script.
- Jia You yuan bao (Chinese: 嘉祐元寶; pinyin: jiā yòu yuánbǎo) (1056–1063). Written in seal, regular, and li script.

== Yuan dynasty ==
The Yuan dynasty (1271–1368), established by the Mongol Empire, greatly reduced the production of copper cash coins in favour of state‑issued paper money (jiaochao) and silver sycees. Although early Mongol rulers continued to circulate coins from the preceding Jin and Song dynasties, they later issued their own cash with inscriptions in both Chinese characters and the 'Phags-pa script created for the Yuan court.

Major issues include Zhong Tong Yuan Bao, Zhi Yuan Tong Bao, Da Yuan Tong Bao, and Zhizheng Tongbao, many featuring mint marks or year indications in 'Phags-pa on the reverse. Under most Yuan emperors, coinage was limited or suspended entirely, with paper money becoming the dominant medium – a policy that eventually led to severe hyperinflation. Late Yuan reforms briefly revived large denomination coins such as Zhizheng Zhibao, which were legally equivalent to paper money, but political instability and collapsed public confidence ended unified imperial coinage until the Ming dynasty.

== Ming dynasty ==
The Ming dynasty (1368–1644) minted far fewer copper cash coins than the earlier Song dynasty, and relied more heavily on paper money and imported silver sycees (particularly Spanish dollars entering via global trade) as the primary media of exchange. Most coins in circulation were older Tang and Song issues, while official Ming cash was produced in limited quantities and varying qualities.

Official coinage, known as Zhiqian (制錢), included major types such as Hongwu Tongbao, Yongle Tongbao – much of which was struck for foreign trade rather than domestic use – and Jiajing Tongbao. Later issues such as Tianqi Tongbao and Chongzhen Tongbao declined in quality as copper prices rose, leading to debasement and widespread counterfeiting.

During the Ming‑Qing transition, numerous rebel and Southern Ming regimes issued their own coinage, including Yongchang Tongbao, Dashun Tongbao, and Yongli Tongbao.

== Qing dynasty ==
The Qing dynasty (1644–1912) standardized and sustained the production of round copper cash coins with square central holes, maintaining the traditional form established over two millennia of Chinese imperial coinage. Unlike earlier dynasties, which often relied on weight-based inscriptions, Qing cash prominently featured the reign-era title of the ruling emperor, thereby creating a consistent chronological system for numismatic dating.

Official Qing coinage, known as Zhiqian (制錢), was cast under strict central oversight, with major mints operating in the capital, including the Board of Revenue and Board of Works mints, alongside provincial facilities across the empire. Coins typically bore the reign title followed by Tongbao (通寶), such as Kangxi Tongbao, Qianlong Tongbao, and Guangxu Tongbao. Reverse sides commonly display mint marks in Manchu script, a distinctive feature that distinguishes Qing issues from those of preceding dynasties.

Throughout most of the dynasty, copper cash circulated alongside silver sycees and foreign silver dollars, forming a dual monetary system. The Xianfeng era (1851–1861) saw exceptional monetary experimentation amid the Taiping Rebellion, including large‑denomination copper, iron, and lead cash with Zhongbao (重寶) and Yuanbao (元寶) inscriptions to fund military expenditures.

Late Qing reforms introduced modern machine‑struck coins and paper currency, gradually phasing out traditional cast-cash coins. Despite these changes, the standard square‑holed cash coin remained in everyday use until the end of imperial rule, representing the final and longest‑running iteration of ancient Chinese coinage.

== See also ==
- History of Chinese currency
- China Numismatic Museum
- China Numismatic Society
- Jin dynasty coinage (1115–1234)
- Kucha coinage
- Liao dynasty coinage
- List of Chinese cash coins by inscription
- Sycee (yuanbao), the gold and silver ingots also used as currency under imperial China
- Western Xia coinage

== Notes ==
Preceded by: Zhou dynasty coinage Reason: Unification of China under the Qin.	Currency of China; 221 BCE – 1127 CE	Succeeded by: Southern Song dynasty coinage Reason: Jurchen conquest of Northern China.
Preceded by: Zhou dynasty coinage Reason: Unification of China under the Qin.	Currency of China; 221 BCE – 1127 CE	Succeeded by: Western Xia coinage Reason: Tangut Dingnan Jiedushi gained independence.
Preceded by: Zhou dynasty coinage Reason: Unification of China under the Qin.	Currency of China; 221 BCE – 1127 CE	Succeeded by: Liao dynasty coinage Reason: Khitan conquest of Northern China.
