= Coins of China =

Coins of China could refer to:

- Ancient Chinese coinage
- Cash (Chinese coin)
- Coins of the Chinese yuan
- Coins of the modern Renminbi
