= China Numismatic Museum =

Museum about currency in Beijing

Coordinates: 39.90075°N 116.38875°E

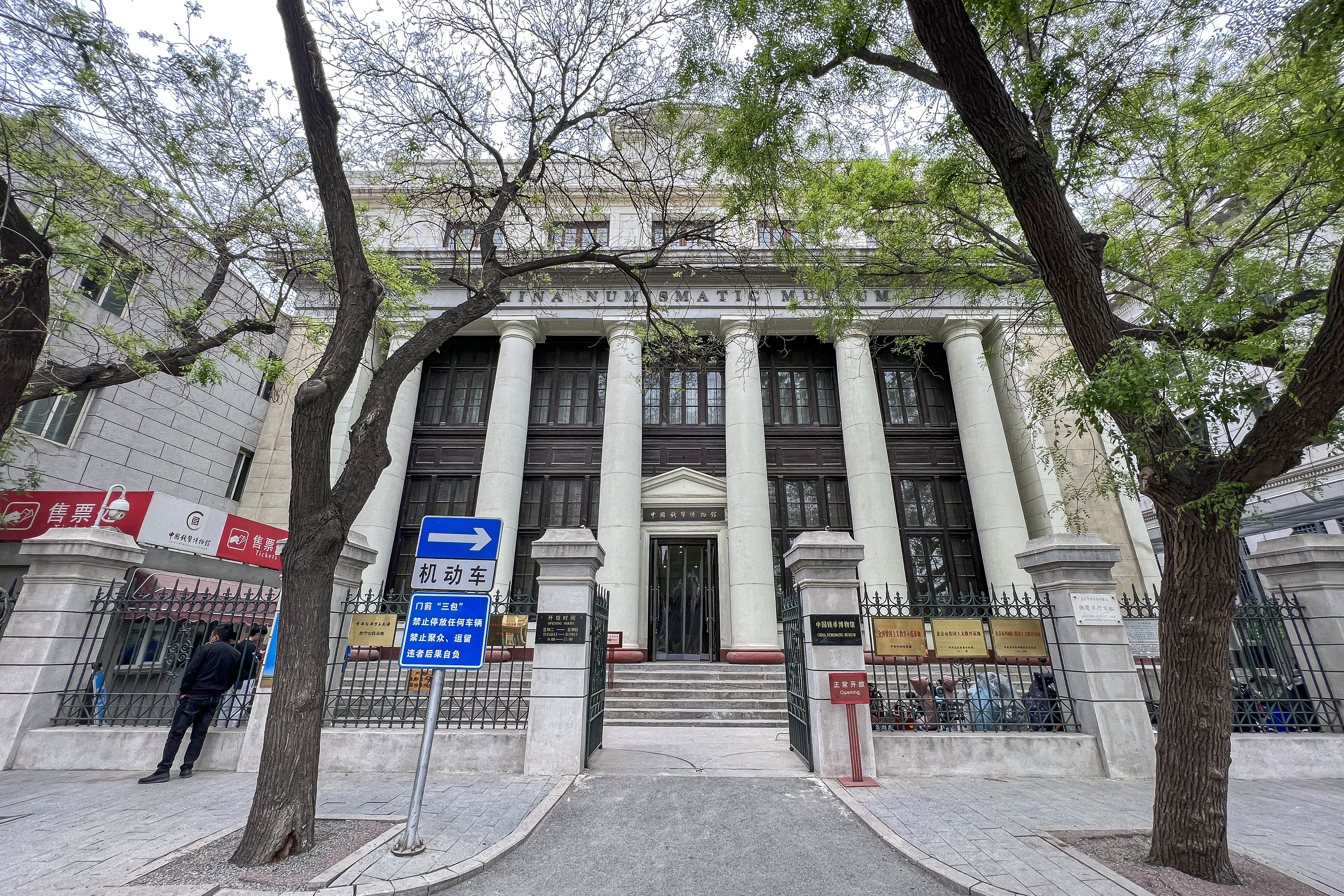
Museum exterior

The China Numismatic Museum (Chinese: 中国钱币博物馆; pinyin: Zhōngguó Qiánbì Bówùguǎn) is a museum about currency in Beijing, China.

== About the museum ==
The China Numismatic Museum is under the management of the People's Bank of China. It was founded in 1992, ten years after the founding of the China Numismatic Society. It is located just off Tian'anmen Square, in Beijing at no. 17 Xijiaomin Xiang, Xicheng District, Beijing. The museum has two buildings that were formerly the Commercial Guarantee Bank of China and the Central Bank of China Peking Branch. Its remit is to collect, display and research ancient, modern and contemporary currencies and objects relating to banking history. It has a collection of over 300,000 numismatic objects. It is a member of the International Numismatic Council and a member of council of the International Committee for Money and Banking Museums (ICOMON).

The China Numismatic Museum is also the home of the secretariat of the China Numismatic Society (CNS), which was founded in 1982, a non-governmental, non-profit, academic organisation registered with the Ministry of Civil Affairs.

== Exhibitions ==
- Ancient Chinese Coin-casting Technology
- Anti-Counterfeit Money
- Red Regime Currency

== Publications ==
The China Numismatic Society is part of the China Numismatic Museum. It produces a regular journal China Numismatics (Zhongguo qianbi 中国钱币), and also publishes books. It has published over 20 books in its China Numismatic Series:

- 1：《秦汉钱币研究》 Research on Qin and Han Coinage
- 2：《新疆红钱大全图说》 Complete Illustrated Catalogue of Xinjiang Red Coins
- 3：《新订北宋符合泉志》 Newly Edited Northern Song Catalogue
- 4：《中国钱票》 Notes issued by private banks in China
- 5：《咸丰钱的版式系列—自藏自拓咸丰钱集》 Xianfeng Coin Types
- 6：《中国山西民间票帖》 Privately issued paper money in Shanxi province, China
- 7：《民国地方钱票图录》 Illustrated catalogue of local banknotes in the Republican period
- 8：《两宋铁钱》 Iron coins of the Northern and Southern Song
- 9：《先秦货币研究》 Research on Pre-Qin Currency
- 10：《福建货币史略》 History of money in Fujian
- 11：《钱币学与冶铸史论丛》 Collection of papers on numismatics and casting history
- 12：《半两钱研究与发现》 Research and discoveries of banliang coins
- 13：《中国古代钱币合金成分研究》 Research on the metal alloys of coins in ancient China
- 14：《两宋货币史料汇编》 Historical materials relating to the money of the Northern and Southern Song
- 15：《永隆通宝钱范》 On Yong long tongbao coin moulds
- 16：《世界各国铸币史》 History of the different currencies of the world
- 17：《戴志强钱币学文集》 Collection of numismatic papers by Dai Zhiqiang
- 18：《中国近代机制币》 Machine-struck coins of modern China
- 19：《中国铜元分类研究（上下册）》 Classification of Chinese copper dollars (2 vols)
- 20：《清代地方私帖图录》 Illustrated catalogue of local notes of the Qing dynasty
- 21：《新编顺治通宝钱谱》 Newly edited Catalogue of Shunzhi tongbao coins
- 22：《新疆历史货币》 Historical coinage of Xinjiang
- 23：《北宋铜钱》 Bronze coins of the Northern and Southern Song
- 24：《川康银锭》 Silver ingots of Chuan-Kang
- 25：《钱币与西域历史研究》 Coins and historical research of Tibet
- 26：《金紫银青—金银钱币的研究与收藏》Gold and silver treasures - researching and collecting gold and silver coins

== Research projects ==
- Ancient Chinese Sycee Casting Technology
- Research on Ancient Chinese Coin-casting Technology

== See also ==
- List of museums in China
- List of numismatic collections
