= China Numismatic Society =

The China Numismatic Society (Chinese: 中国钱币学会; pinyin: Zhōngguó qiánbì xuéhuì) is a society focusing on numismatics in the People's Republic of China, with its secretariat in the China Numismatic Museum in Beijing.

== About ==
The China Numismatic Society (CNS) was founded in 1982. It is a non-governmental academic organization registered with the Ministry of Civil Affairs. It is a full member of International Numismatic Commission (INC).

CNS is a non-profit academic organization comprising research institutes of numismatics, numismatics researchers, collectors and volunteers. Its mission is: "to unite all members and fans of numismatics, abide by the Constitution, laws and regulations of the state as well as the social ethics, organize various academic activities on numismatics and push forward numismatic studies and researches on the monetary history, organize coin-collecting activities oriented to the public and publicize the awareness about numismatics; to carry forward Chinese numismatic culture and serve the people and socialist construction. CNS is subject to the guidance and supervision from People’s Bank of China (PBOC) and the Ministry of Civil Affairs, as well as the guidance from Chinese Academy of Social Sciences, the Ministry of Culture and the State Administration of Cultural Heritage."

== Publications ==
=== Journal: China Numismatics ===
The Society publishes the journal China Numismatics 《中国钱币》. The journal includes an annual summary of numismatic research, which in recent years has formed the basis of the China section of the INC's Survey of Numismatic Literature; see for example (the following are all in English):

- Summary of Numismatic Research in China, 2013
- China – A Survey of Numismatic Literature 2008–2012
- China – a survey of numismatic literature 2002–2007
- Summary of Chinese numismatics 2011
- Summary of Chinese numismatics 2010
- English summaries, published in the Journal of the Oriental Numismatic Society – Zhongguo Qianbi 76–79 (2002/1-4), in ONS Newsletter 176 (Summer 2003), pp.19–28. Zhongguo Qianbi 74–75 (2001/3-4), in ONS Newsletter 174 (Winter 2003), pp.28–33. Zhongguo Qianbi 72–73 (2001/1-2), in ONS Newsletter 173 (Autumn 2002), pp.27–30. Zhongguo Qianbi 70–71 (2000/3-4), in ONS Newsletter 168 (Spring 2001), pp.23–28. Zhongguo Qianbi 68–69 (2000/1-2), in ONS Newsletter 165 (Autumn 2000), pp.19–22.

=== Books ===
The China Numismatic Society has published over 20 books in its China Numismatic Series:

- 1: 《秦汉钱币研究》 Research on Qin and Han Coinage
- 2: 《新疆红钱大全图说》 Complete Illustrated Catalogue of Xinjiang Red Coins
- 3: 《新订北宋符合泉志》 Newly Edited Northern Song Catalogue
- 4: 《中国钱票》 Notes issued by private banks in China
- 5: 《咸丰钱的版式系列--自藏自拓咸丰钱集》 Xianfeng Coin Types
- 6: 《中国山西民间票帖》 Privately issued paper money in Shanxi province, China
- 7: 《民国地方钱票图录》 Illustrated catalogue of local banknotes in the Republican period
- 8: 《两宋铁钱》 Iron coins of the Northern and Southern Song
- 9: 《先秦货币研究》 Research on Pre-Qin Currency
- 10: 《福建货币史略》 History of money in Fujian
- 11: 《钱币学与冶铸史论丛》 Collection of papers on numismatics and casting history
- 12: 《半两钱研究与发现》 Research and discoveries of banliang coins
- 13: 《中国古代钱币合金成分研究》 Research on the metal alloys of coins in ancient China
- 14: 《两宋货币史料汇编》 Historical materials relating to the money of the Northern and Southern Song
- 15: 《永隆通宝钱范》 On Yong long tongbao coin moulds
- 16: 《世界各国铸币史》 History of the different currencies of the world
- 17: 《戴志强钱币学文集》 Collection of numismatic papers by Dai Zhiqiang
- 18: 《中国近代机制币》 Machine-struck coins of modern China
- 19: 《中国铜元分类研究（上下册）》 Classification of Chinese copper dollars (2 vols)
- 20: 《清代地方私帖图录》 Illustrated catalogue of local notes of the Qing dynasty
- 21: 《新编顺治通宝钱谱》 Newly edited Catalogue of Shunzhi tongbao coins
- 22: 《新疆历史货币》 Historical coinage of Xinjiang
- 23: 《北宋铜钱》 Bronze coins of the Northern and Southern Song
- 24: 《川康银锭》 Silver ingots of Chuan-Kang
- 25: 《钱币与西域历史研究》 Coins and historical research of Tibet
- 26: 《金紫银青--金银钱币的研究与收藏》Gold and silver treasures – researching and collecting gold and silver coins
