= Ant-nose coin =

Historical currency of China

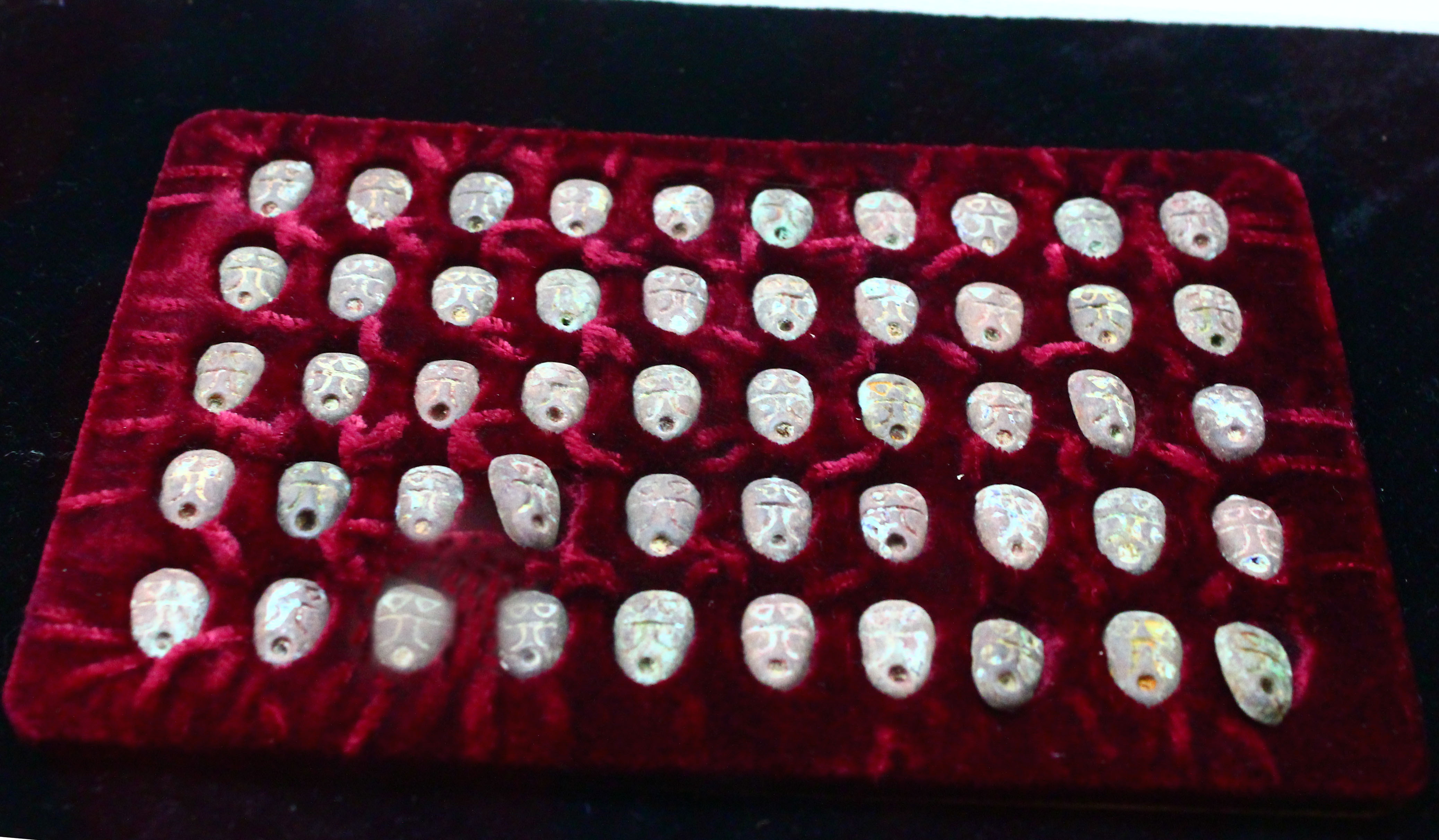
Ant-nose coins, unearthed at Yezhu Lake (野猪湖), Xiaogan, Hubei Province, taken at Hubei Provincial Museum

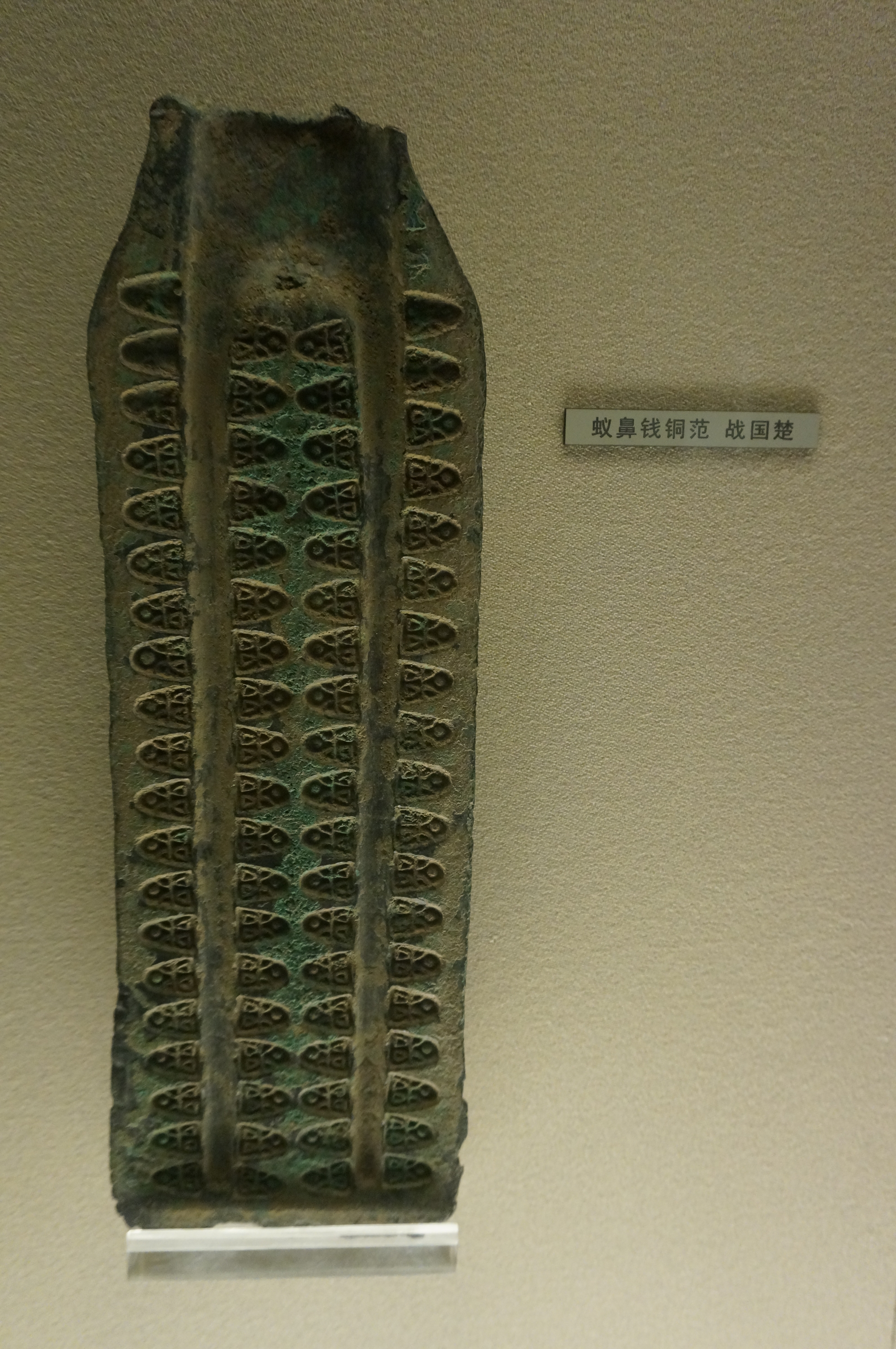
A mold for ant-nose coins, taken at Shanghai Museum

Ant-nose coin (Chinese: 蚁鼻钱; pinyin: yǐ bí qián, coin like the nose of ant), also called ant nose money, yibi cowry, Yibi coin and so on, was a small bronze coin minted by the state of Chu during the Warring States period. In Chinese, it is also called "鬼脸钱" (guǐ liǎn qián, coin like the face of a ghost).

== See also ==
- Zhou dynasty coinage
