= Zhouyuan Tongbao =

Later Zhou Chinese copper-alloy cash coin

Zhouyuan Tongbao (周元通寳)
- Later Zhou dynasty
- Value: 1 wén
- Mass: 3.45~3.65 g
- Diameter: 25 mm
- Composition: Bronze
- Years of minting: 955–959

Obverse
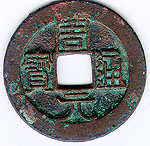
- Design: Zhouyuan Tongbao (周元通寳) (Note: Often written as "周元通寶".)

Reverse
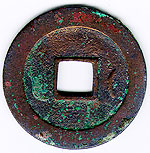
- Design: Various

The Zhouyuan Tongbao (traditional Chinese: 周元通寳; simplified Chinese: 周元通宝; pinyin: zhōuyuán tōng bǎo) is a copper-alloy cash coin produced during the reign of Emperor Shizong of the Later Zhou dynasty, a historical Chinese state that existed in the Five Dynasties and Ten Kingdoms period. The design of the Zhouyuan Tongbao cash coins closely resembles that of the Kaiyuan Tongbao (開元通寳) series produced during the earlier Tang dynasty period. The Zhouyuan Tongbao cash coins were produced from recycled Buddhist statues confiscated from Buddhist temples. For this reason the Zhouyuan Tongbao is commonly referred to as "Arhat money" (traditional Chinese: 羅漢錢; simplified Chinese: 罗汉钱; pinyin: Luóhàn qián) or as the "money that destroyed Buddha" (traditional Chinese: 毀佛錢; simplified Chinese: 毁佛钱; pinyin: Huǐ fú qián). Nicknames only reserved for a handful of Chinese cash coins, as confiscation of Buddhist statues for coin production only happened around 7 times in Chinese history.

Superstitions surrounding these bronze cash coins claim that they have amuletic properties because they were cast from Buddhist statues, and are particularly said to be effective in midwifery, hence many later-made imitations and amulets based on them exist and they have remained a popular motif for Chinese and Vietnamese amulets.

== History ==
During the Five Dynasties and Ten Kingdoms period, Guo Wei, a native of Yaoshan, Xingzhou, founded the Later Zhou state in Dongjing (東京, present-day Kaifeng, Henan Province) in 951. In 954, Guo Wei's adopted son Chai Rong succeeded to the throne, in Chinese historiography he is referred to Emperor Zhou Shizong, and adopted reign era to Xiande (顯德). During this period, there was a shortage of bronze cash coins in circulation in Later Zhou making private transactions were very difficult.

The Zhouyuan Tongbao commenced production in the year Xiande 2 (顯德二年), February 955 AD (using the Gregorian calendar), during the reign of Emperor Shizong and was the first cash coin produced by the Later Zhou dynasty. It is said that Emperor Shizong himself would supervise their casting at the many large furnaces at the back of the palace.

The Later Zhou dynasty was heavily in debt and in order to try to pay off the government's debts, Emperor Shizong started a campaign to procure enough copper for the production of cash coins. As copper was scarce during the Later Zhou period, the government tried confiscate enough bronze to cash coins to be able to pay for government expenditures and a number of policies were enacted, initially Emperor Shizong prohibited households from holding bronze utensils and later the Later Zhou would confiscate the assets of Buddhist temples to produce bronze cash coins.

The imperial government of the Later Zhou dynasty re-melted Buddhist bronze statues from 3356 temples to produce bronze coins. This decision was not just opposed by the Buddhists but also by his advisors, including both civil and military mandarins. When reproached for this, the emperor claimed that Gautama Buddha himself would not mind this sacrifice.

Generally speaking, cash coins produced from the Warring States period until the reign of the Jiajing Emperor of the Ming dynasty were made of bronze, but because the Zhouyuan Tongbao cash coins were cast from melted Buddhist statues, which are typically brass, they contain higher levels of zinc that other coinages from this period. Though zinc was present in these coins, the quantity remains quite low overall with values of zinc up to 2–4%.

Because they were believed to have spiritual powers inherited from the Buddhist statues, these coins were subsequently much-copied throughout Chinese history, these copies are popularly known as "folk coins" (民俗錢) and are believed to have the same spiritual powers as the original coins.

== Design ==
The design and calligraphy of the Zhouyuan Tongbao very closely resembles those of the Kaiyuan Tongbao series of cash coins produced during the Tang dynasty period. It is a typical bronze Xiaoping Qian (小平錢) in size and weight, and its inscription is written using clerical script. The second stroke of the "Yuan" (元) character is written "picked from the left" ("元"字第二筆左挑). (Note: Some cash coins, such as this one, have a "yuan" (元) character with a left shoulder, or zuo tiao (左挑). While other cash coins may have the "yuan" with a right shoulder (右挑, you tiao) or both shoulders (双挑, shuang tiao).)

The reverse side of the Zhouyuan Tongbao cash coins sometimes have moon (crescent), star (dot), or star-moon (crescent and dot) patterns. The star (dot) patterns are either left, right, up or down, and the moon patterns are not always in the same place, they are either up or down, left or right, or near a corner. According to Chinese economic historian Zhao Dexin (赵德馨), the moon (crescent) on the back of every coin seems to represent one of the eight trigrams. Therefore, it is said that the moon (crescent) patterns found on Zhouyuan Tongbao cash coins are closely related to the five elements, yin and yang, new life, and the beginning of the day (further reading: "Han dynasty coinage § "Yin Yang" and the "Five Elements" as the basis for Star, Moon, Cloud, and Dragon symbols on ancient Chinese coins and charms").

Zhouyuan Tongbao cash coins generally have a diameter of about 24 mm to 25 mm, with the largest recorded one being 25.8 mm, and the smallest one being only 22.6 mm. They typically weigh between 3 and 4 grams, with the heaviest recorded one being 4.6 grams, and the lightest one being only 2.9 grams.

== List of variants of the Zhouyuan Tongbao ==
Type and description	Catalogue numbers	Image
Reverse: Plain.	Hartill #15.12, Schjøth #414	
Reverse: Crescent located above.	Hartill #15.13	
Reverse: Crescent located at the upper right side.	Hartill #15.14, FD #767&c, Schjøth #419&c	
Reverse: Crescent located right of the square central hole.	Hartill #15.15	
Reverse: Crescent located at the lower right side.	Hartill #15.16	
Reverse: Crescent located at the bottom.	Hartill #15.17	
Reverse: Crescent located at the lower left side.	Hartill #15.18	
Reverse: Crescent located left of the square central hole.	Hartill #15.19	
Reverse: Crescent located at the upper left side.	Hartill #15.20	
Reverse: Crescent below, dot left.	Hartill #15.21, FD #768	
Reverse: Crescent above, dot below.	Hartill #15.22, Schjøth #427	
Reverse: Dot above.	Hartill #15.23, FD #764	
Reverse: Dot below.	Hartill #15.24	
Reverse: Dot right.	Hartill #15.25, Schjøth #426	
Obverse: Dot below tong (通).	Hartill #15.26	
Inscription repeated upside down on the reverse side.	Hartill #15.27, FD #769	

Catalogue numbers

- Hartill = Cast Chinese Coins by David Hartill. Trafford, United Kingdom: Trafford Publishing. September 22, 2005. ISBN 978-1412054669.
- FD = Fisher's Ding (丁), George A. Fisher's copy of Ding Fubao's (丁福保) original work catalogue, 1980, 251 pages.
- Schjøth = "Chinese Currency, Currency of the Far East - A Comprehensive Text Chou Dynasty, 1122 B.C.–255 B.C. Through Ch'ing Dynasty 1644 A.D.–1911 A.D." by Fredrik Schjøth and Virgil Hancock, Oslow, Norway, 1929.

== Zhouyuan Tongbao and superstitions ==
=== Traditional Chinese medicine ===
In traditional Chinese medicine (TCM) the Zhouyuan Tongbao is believed to have preventative powers against malaria and both miscarriages and various childbirth complications, such as dystocia. Pregnant women are advised to carry a Zhouyuan Tongbao cash coin around for both a smoother pregnancy and childbirth.

=== Zhouyuan Tongbao charms ===
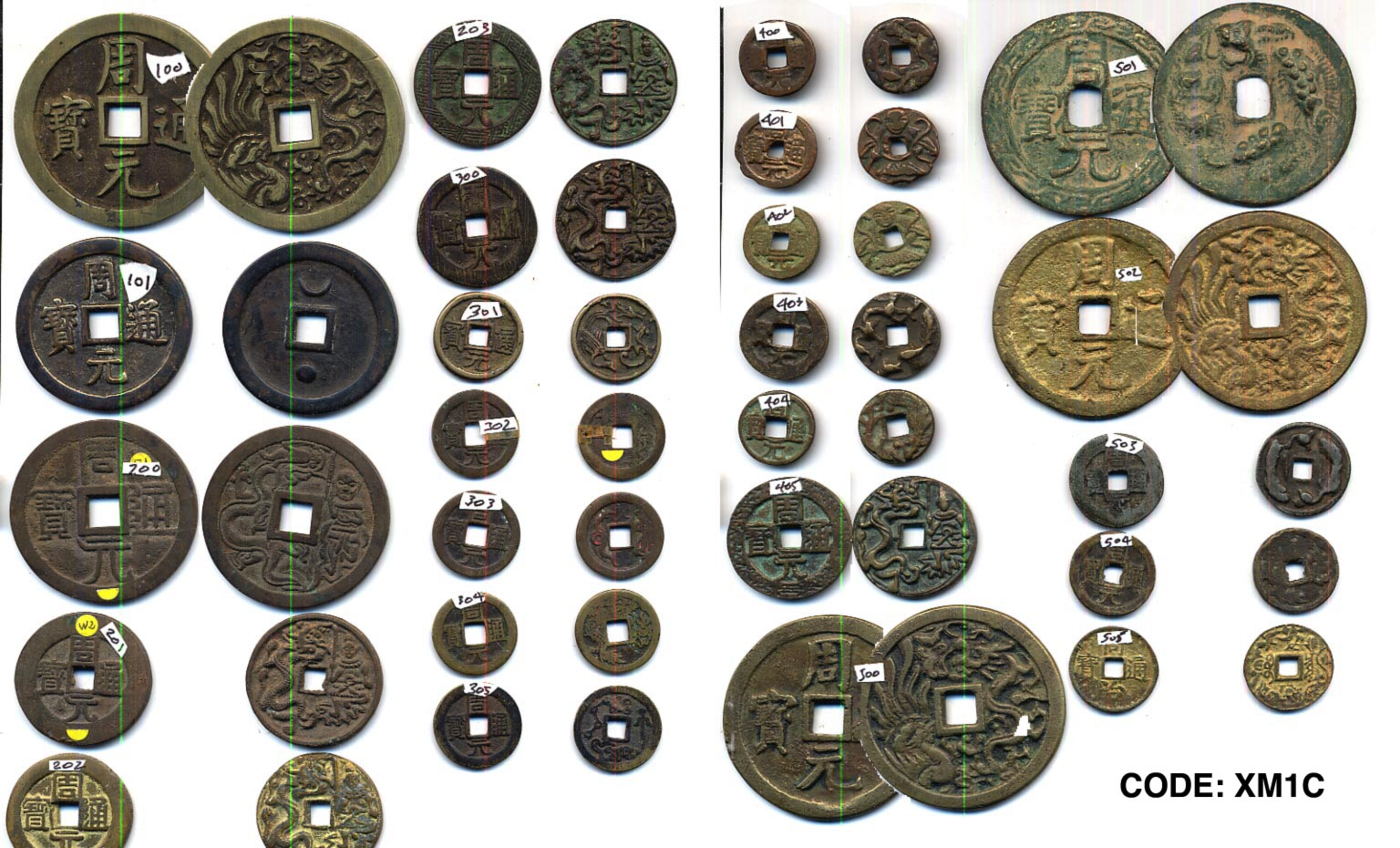
Various types of Zhouyuan Tongbao (周元通寳) charms.

As the Zhouyuan Tongbao was created from Buddhist statues the inscription very quickly became a popular inscription used on Chinese numismatic charms (see "Chinese charms with coin inscriptions"). As ancient Chinese people believed that Zhouyuan Tongbao cash coins were "auspicious" because of there origins, this belief Was carried over to the coin charms and amulets produced during the following centuries which display the same inscription. The general idea behind the "charm powers" of the Zhouyuan Tongbao inscription is based on the fact that the original cash coins were created from Buddhist statues meaning that their religious significance was transferred to the cash coins.

Variant Zhouyuan Tongbao charms typically have the same obverse side as the original cash coin, but the reverse side of the coin charm shows a different design. These charms include reverse sides featuring "suns" and "moons" represented by dots and crescents, the dragon and fenghuang symbolising matrimonial harmony, a meditating Lohan, and other symbols. Besides metal, Zhouyuan Tongbao charms can also be made of other materials such as jade.

In Vietnam, a number of coin amulets with the inscription Châu Nguyên Thông Bảo (the Vietnamese reading of the traditional Chinese characters "周元通寳") were also produced, some of the amulets with this inscription were uniquely produced and used as lucky and protective charms in Vietnam. According to French numismatist François Thierry some of these Vietnamese Châu Nguyên Thông Bảo amulets had distinctive features that differentiated them from their Chinese counterparts, for example some Vietnamese amulets with this inscription are written using an elegant form of the bā fēn (八分) style of Chinese calligraphy (alternatively known as "diverting style"), which was developed during the Han dynasty period. Thierry further states that the Châu Nguyên Thông Bảo amulet was especially desired by Chinese and Vietnamese women who wished to have a male child, as it was believed that being in possession of this amulet would increase the chances of having a son.

==== List of Zhouyuan Tongbao charms ====
List of variants of Chinese charms, amulets, and talismans based on the Zhouyuan Tongbao cash coins with the same or derivative inscriptions:

Abbreviations: t = top; b = bottom; r = right; l = left; char/ = Character amulet (inscription-only), and Char/pic = Character+pictorial amulet.

Type	Inscription (Traditional Chinese)	Meaning	Catalogue numbers	Image
Same inscription
Reverse: Plain. Script as the cash coin. 40 mm.	Zhouyuan Tongbao (周元通寳)	The cash coins supposedly have amuletic properties because they were made from Buddhist statues, and are particularly perceived to be effective in midwifery - hence the many later-made imitations which closely resemble the coins.	Hartill #4.2367, ACV #178	
Reverse: Plain. Char/ square hole.	Zhouyuan Tongbao (周元通寳)	The cash coins supposedly have amuletic properties because they were made from Buddhist statues, and are particularly perceived to be effective in midwifery - hence the many later-made imitations which closely resemble the coins.	Hartill #4.2368	
Reverse: Plain. Char/ square hole: 42 mm, Vietnamese.	Châu Nguyên Thông Bảo (周元通寳)	The cash coins supposedly have amuletic properties because they were made from Buddhist statues, and are particularly perceived to be effective in midwifery - hence the many later-made imitations which closely resemble the coins.	Hartill #4.2369, ACV #179	
Reverse: Plain. Char/ square hole.	Zhouyuan Tongbao (周元通寳)		Hartill #4.2373	
Obverse: clockwise. Reverse: Plain. Char/ square hole: 64 mm.	Zhouyuan Tongbao (周元通寳)		Hartill #4.2374, CS #550	
Reverse: As obverse. Char/char square hole.	Zhouyuan Tongbao (周元通寳)		Hartill #4.2375	
Reverse: The Eight Trigrams. Char/pic square hole.	Zhouyuan Tongbao (周元通寳)		Hartill #4.2376	
Reverse: Dot t ☰ (The first of the Eight Trigrams). Char/pic square hole.	Zhouyuan Tongbao (周元通寳)		Hartill #4.2377	
Reverse: Crescent t. Char/pic square hole. Many of the authentic Zhouyuan Tongbao cash coins also have crescents and dots, but they are rather faint.	Zhouyuan Tongbao (周元通寳)		Hartill #4.2378	
Reverse: Seated Buddha t. Char/pic square hole.	Zhouyuan Tongbao (周元通寳)		Hartill #4.2379	
The reverse side shows a "moon" (represented by a crescent, see "Han dynasty coinage § Dots, crescents, circles, numbers, counting rods, Chinese characters, and other symbols appearing on coins") between the square central hole and the rim at the 7 o'clock position. These coin charms typically have a diameter of 24 millimeters and a weight of 3.5 grams.	Zhouyuan Tongbao (周元通寳)	The crescent on the reverse is said to represent the moon. In Chinese mythology the moon is the residence of Jin Chan. In Taoist mythology the "Jade Rabbit" (a.k.a. the "Moon Hare") lives on the moon, and is known for making the elixir of immortality. The moon is often a location for various figures from Chinese mythology.		
Reverse: Seated Arhat (Lohan) around the hole. Char/pic square hole.	Zhouyuan Tongbao (周元通寳)		Hartill #4.2380	
Reverse: Seated Arhat (Lohan). Char/pic square hole.	Zhouyuan Tongbao (周元通寳)		Hartill #4.2381	
Reverse: Similar. Char/pic square hole.	Zhouyuan Tongbao (周元通寳)		Hartill #4.2382	
Reverse: Fish jumping over the Dragon Gate. Char/pic square hole.	Zhouyuan Tongbao (周元通寳)	The fish's jumping feature is set in such a proverbial Chinese idiom as "Liyu (Carp) jumps over the Dragon Gate" (鯉躍龍門), which is an idiom that conveys a vivid image symbolising a sudden uplifting in one's social status.	Hartill #4.2383	
Obverse: Scrollwork on rim. Reverse: Emblems. Char/pic square hole.	Zhouyuan Tongbao (周元通寳)		Hartill #4.2384	
Reverse: Seven Stars tl Sword r Snake and Tortoise b. Char/pic square hole.	Zhouyuan Tongbao (周元通寳)		Hartill #4.2385	
Obverse: Broad rim. Reverse: Moon t Sword r Snake b Seven Stars 1. Char/pic squ hole.	Zhouyuan Tongbao (周元通寳)		Hartill #4.2387	
Reverse: Sun & Moon r Seven Stars. Char/pic square hole.	Zhouyuan Tongbao (周元通寳)		Hartill #4.2386, S #1.127.	
Reverse: Dragon and fenghuang. Char/pic squ hole: 26 mm.	Zhouyuan Tongbao (周元通寳)	The dragon and fenghuang are often used as a symbol of harmony in marriage. Often the dragon is used to represent the emperor and the fenghuang the empress-consort.	Hartill #4.2388	
A Zhouyuan Tongbao coin charm version with a reverse dragon and fenghuang design, some versions have a dragon on the left side and a fenghuang on its right. The two mythical creatures are facing each other with their heads at the bottom of the reverse side of the coin charm. The diameter of this version is 22.5 millimeters and it has a weight of 5.6 grams.	Zhouyuan Tongbao (周元通寳)	The dragon and fenghuang are often used as a symbol of harmony in marriage. Often the dragon is used to represent the emperor and the fenghuang the empress-consort.		
A Zhouyuan Tongbao coin charm with a dragon and fenghuang reverse has the dragon on the right and the fenghuang on left. The Chinese dragon, which is located on the right side of the amulet with the tip of its mouth at the 12 o'clock position and a dot representing its left eye at the 1 o'clock position. The dragon's left front claw is just above the square central hole. Its body curves down the right side of the coin charm and its left rear claw is depicted just below the square central hole. While it isn't a very easy to see on it, the wings of the fenghuang are just to the left of the square hole. The head of the fenghuang is at the 11 o'clock position of the coin charm and the fenghuang's tail feathers are at the 7 o'clock position. The dragon's tail is almost touching the fenghuang's upper tail feather. The two mythical creatures on this coin charm are depicted facing each other by showcasing their heads at the top rather than the bottom. This version of the Zhouyuan Tongbao charm has a diameter of 25 millimeters and weighs 6.6 grams.	Zhouyuan Tongbao (周元通寳)	The dragon and fenghuang are often used as a symbol of harmony in marriage. Often the dragon is used to represent the emperor and the fenghuang the empress-consort.		
A Zhouyuan Tongbao coin charm version with the dragon is on the right and the fenghuang is on the left has them sculpted in high relief. Like the above variant these two mythical creatures face each other at the top of the charm, depicting both heads there. This version of the charm has a diameter of 23.5 millimeters and weighs 6.8 grams.	Zhouyuan Tongbao (周元通寳)	The dragon and fenghuang are often used as a symbol of harmony in marriage. Often the dragon is used to represent the emperor and the fenghuang the empress-consort.		
Reverse: Dragon. Char/pic square hole.	Zhouyuan Tongbao (周元通寳)		Hartill #4.2389	
Reverse: Shaggy Dragon and fenghuang. Char/pic square hole.	Zhouyuan Tongbao (周元通寳)	The dragon and fenghuang are often used as a symbol of harmony in marriage. Often the dragon is used to represent the emperor and the fenghuang the empress-consort.	Hartill #4.2390	
Reverse: Dragon and fenghuang. Char/pic square hole.	Zhouyuan Tongbao (周元通寳)	The dragon and fenghuang are often used as a symbol of harmony in marriage. Often the dragon is used to represent the emperor and the fenghuang the empress-consort.	Hartill #4.2391	
Reverse: Dragon and fenghuang. Char/pic square hole: 22 mm.	Zhouyuan Tongbao (周元通寳)	The dragon and fenghuang are often used as a symbol of harmony in marriage. Often the dragon is used to represent the emperor and the fenghuang the empress-consort.	Hartill #4.2392, CC #154	
Reverse: Dragon and fenghuang. Char/pic square hole: 23 mm.	Zhouyuan Tongbao (周元通寳)	The dragon and fenghuang are often used as a symbol of harmony in marriage. Often the dragon is used to represent the emperor and the fenghuang the empress-consort.	Hartill #4.2393, AC #269, CS #139	
Reverse: Dragon and fenghuang. Char/pic squ hole: 26 mm.	Zhouyuan Tongbao (周元通寳)	The dragon and fenghuang are often used as a symbol of harmony in marriage. Often the dragon is used to represent the emperor and the fenghuang the empress-consort.	Hartill #4.2394, AC #270	
Reverse: Dragon and fenghuang. Char/pic square hole.	Zhouyuan Tongbao (周元通寳)	The dragon and fenghuang are often used as a symbol of harmony in marriage. Often the dragon is used to represent the emperor and the fenghuang the empress-consort.	Hartill #4.2395, CS #138 (25 mm), AC #271 (28 mm)	
Reverse: Dragon and fenghuang. Char/pic square squ hole.	Zhouyuan Tongbao (周元通寳)	The dragon and fenghuang are often used as a symbol of harmony in marriage. Often the dragon is used to represent the emperor and the fenghuang the empress-consort.	Hartill #4.2396	
Reverse: Dragon and fenghuang. Char/pic square hole.	Zhouyuan Tongbao (周元通寳)	The dragon and fenghuang are often used as a symbol of harmony in marriage. Often the dragon is used to represent the emperor and the fenghuang the empress-consort.	Hartill #4.2397	
Rev: Dragon and Flaming Pearl. Char/pic square hole: 25 mm.	Zhouyuan Tongbao (周元通寳)		Hartill #4.2398	
Obverse: Lei wen rim. Reverse: Dragon in high relief. Char/pic square hole. 20th century.	Zhouyuan Tongbao (周元通寳)		Hartill #4.2399	
Rev: Dragon and fenghuang in high relief. Char/pic square hole. Late 19th-early 20th century.	Zhouyuan Tongbao (周元通寳)	The dragon and fenghuang are often used as a symbol of harmony in marriage. Often the dragon is used to represent the emperor and the fenghuang the empress-consort.	Hartill #4.2400, CC #441 (60 mm), ACV #162 (63 mm)	
Reverse: Zhou Chu killing the Dragon. Char/pic square hole.	Zhouyuan Tongbao (周元通寳)		Hartill #4.2401, ACV #264 (37 mm), AC #177-8 (38 mm)	
Reverse: Zhou Chu killing the Dragon. Char/pic square hole: 28 mm.	Zhouyuan Tongbao (周元通寳)		Hartill #4.2402, AC #179	
Reverse: Zhou Chu killing an emaciated Dragon. Char/pic square hole.	Zhouyuan Tongbao (周元通寳)		Hartill #4.2403	
Reverse: Zhou Chu killing the Dragon. Engraving on field. Char/pic square hole.	Zhouyuan Tongbao (周元通寳)		Hartill #4.2404	
Reverse: Zhou Chu killing the Tiger. Char/pic square hole: 39 mm.	Zhouyuan Tongbao (周元通寳)		Hartill #4.2405, AC #180	
Reverse: Four loving couples engaging in sexual intercourse. Char/pic squ hole.	Zhouyuan Tongbao (周元通寳)		Hartill #4.2407, Cf AC3 #10	
Reverse: 4 loving couples having sex in different positions. Char/char square hole.	Zhouyuan Tongbao (周元通寳)		Hartill #4.2408	
Reverse: Sun and Moon symbols r & l. Char/pic square hole.	Zhouyuan Tongbao (周元通寳)		Hartill #4.2409	
Reverse: Dui (兌) ☱ t & b. The second of the Eight Trigrams. Char/char square hole.	Zhouyuan Tongbao - Dui Dui (周元通寳 - 兌☱)		Hartill #4.2410	
Reverse: Ban Liang (半兩) written in Chinese seal script. Crescent t Eight Trigrams around Yin Yang b. - Char/var square hole: 40 mm.	Zhouyuan Tongbao (周元通寳 - 半兩)		Hartill #4.2411	
Reverse: Similar. Ban Liang (半兩) in regular script.	Zhouyuan Tongbao - Ban Liang (周元通寳 - 半兩)		Hartill #4.2412	
Reverse: Sun 日 (Sun) r Moon b 月 (Moon) l. Char/var squ hole: 24 mm.	Zhouyuan Tongbao - Ri Yue (周元通寳 - 日月)		Hartill #4.2413, CC #153	
Reverse: A 龍鳳 (Dragon, fenghuang). Char/char square hole.	Zhouyuan Tongbao - Long Feng (周元通寳 - 龍鳳)	The dragon and fenghuang are often used as a symbol of harmony in marriage. Often the dragon is used to represent the emperor and the fenghuang the empress-consort.	Hartill #4.2414	
Reverse: 平南 (Peace, South - meaning not clear). Char/char square hole.	Zhouyuan Tongbao - Ping Nan (周元通寳 - 平南)		Hartill #4.2415	
Reverse: 文王 (King Wen). Char/char square hole. King Wen was the King of Zhou (1152 - 1056 BC) during the late Shang dynasty period in ancient China. He was posthumously honoured as the founder of the Zhou dynasty.	Zhouyuan Tongbao - Wen Wang (周元通寳 - 文王)		Hartill #4.2416	
Obverse: Double rim. Reverse: The Twelve Zodiac characters. Char/char square hole: 26 mm.	Zhouyuan Tongbao - Zi Chou Yin Mao Chen Si Wu Wei Shen You Xu Hai (周元通寳 - 子丑寅卯辰巳午未申酉戌亥)		Hartill #4.2417, S #1.140	
Obverse: 天府 (Heavenly Office) on loop. Reverse: Zhou Chu killing the Tiger. 蟾宮 (Palace of the Toad) on loop. Fancy loop Chinese pendant charm, leaves char/pic square hole.	Zhouyuan Tongbao - Tian Fu - Chan Gong (周元通寳 - 天府 - 蟾宮)		Hartill #4.2418	
Derivative inscription
Obverse: Zhou Yuan (The period title of a Five Dynasties Emperor). Sun r Moon l. Reverse: The Eight Trigrams. Char/pic square hole: 67 mm.	Zhou Yuan (周元)		Hartill #4.2359, CS #586	
Obverse: 日 (Sun) r 月 (Moon) l top. F 天下 (Earth) r & l below. Reverse: Dot and Crescent t Figures r & l. Sword? b. Char/pic square hole: 40 mm.	Zhouyuan Tianxia - Ri Yue (周元天下 - 日月)		Hartill #4.2360, CS #450	
Obverse: 日 (Sun) r 月 (Moon) l, Lucky Clouds below. Reverse: The Eight Trigrams. Var/pic square hole: 23 mm.	Zhouyuan Riyue (周元日月)		Hartill #4.2361, CC #155	
Obverse: Zhou Yuan Ri Yue (Zhou Yuan, Sun and Moon). Reverse: The Eight Trigrams in cells. Char/pic square hole.	Zhouyuan Riyue (周元日月)		Hartill #4.2363	
Obverse: Zhou Yuan Tian Lian (Zhou Yuan Heavenly Connection). Dot tl crescent tr. Reverse: 龍鳳 (Dragon and fenghuang). t & b. Char/char square hole: 35 mm.	Zhouyuan Tianlian - Long Feng (周元天連 - 龍鳳)		Hartill #4.2362, CS #448	
Obverse: Zhou Yuan Cui Sheng (Zhou Yuan, Midwifery). Reverse: The Eight Trigrams in radial cells. Char/pic square hole: 36 mm.	Zhouyuan Cuisheng (周元催生)	It is believed that carrying around a Zhouyuan Tongbao cash coin helps women during pregnancy and childbirth.	Hartill #4.2364, CC #350	
Obverse: Zhou Yuan Cui Sheng (Zhou Yuan, Midwifery). Reverse: 龍鳳 (Dragon and fenghuang) t & b Figures? l & r. Char/var square hole 37 mm.	Zhouyuan Cuisheng - Long Feng (周元催生 - 龍鳳)	It is believed that carrying around a Zhouyuan Tongbao cash coin helps women during pregnancy and childbirth.	Hartill #4.2365, CS #449	
Obverse: Zhou Yuan Cui Sheng (Zhou Yuan, Midwifery). Reverse: Chan Zhong Yong Bao (During Childbirth Always Protect). Char/char square squ hole: 26 mm.	Zhouyuan Cuisheng - Chanzhong Yongbao (周元催生 - 產中永保)	It is believed that carrying around a Zhouyuan Tongbao cash coin helps women during pregnancy and childbirth.	Hartill #4.2366, S #4.65	
Obverse: Zhou Yuan Bu Yi (Zhou Yuan, Divination with the Trigrams). Reverse: The Eight Trigrams. Char/pic square hole.	Zhouyuan Buyi (周元卜易)	See: Cash coins in fortune telling	Hartill #4.2419	

Catalogue numbers

- Hartill = Cast Chinese Amulets by David Hartill (13 August 2020).
- ACV = Amulettes de Chine et du Viet-Nam by François Thierry de Crussol, Paris (1987), in French.
- AC = Amulettes de Chine by François Thierry de Crussol, Bibliothèque nationale de France (2008), in French.
- CC = Classic Chinese Charms. Editor: Zheng Yiwei, Deputy Editors: Guo Yi-ling et al. Shanghai (2004).
- CS = Sequel of Classic Chinese Charms. Editor Zheng Yiwei, Deputy Editors Liu Yuan, Li Guangjie. Shanghai 2006.
- S = С. Н. ШЕВЦОВ - КИТАЙСКИЕ МОНЕТОВИАНЫЕ АМУЛЕТЫ НАЛПИСИ, CIOжEты, CимВОлы (Sergei Shevtsov - Chinese Coin Amulets. Inscriptions, Narration, Symbols), Moscow (2019).

== Manufacturing process ==
During the Five Dynasties and Ten Kingdoms period the method employed to produce cash coins was known as the "sand casting method" (翻砂法), which was a technique where cash coins were cast using vertically arranged two-piece moulds. This technique allowed a large number of cash coins to be produced in batches.

In the sand casting method the preparation of moulds was done with fine sand which was reinforced using an organic binder, and placed inside of a wooden box. Consistency of the designs was maintained through the creation of "mother coins" (母錢). Around 50 to 100 "mother coins" were pressed lightly into the surface of the mould box and was followed by the placing down of a second mould box on top of the first one. This allowed for an impression to be taken of both sides of the pattern of the mother coin. After the impression was taken the mould boxes would be turned over and separated, which would allow the mother coin to stay placed on the surface or the lower mould. A new fresh mould box would subsequently be laid on top and this allowed the pair to be turned and separated again. Using this methodology, the mint workers obtained a series of two-piece moulds. Afterwards, the casting channels between the cash coin imprints and a central tunnel were cleared out, allowing the boxes to be fixed together in pairs of two. The final step involved the pouring in of molten metal.

When the process was done and the metal was allowed to cool down a "coin tree" was formed, from this "coin tree" the cash coins could be separated and cleaned up.

== Hoards of Zhouyuan Tongbao cash coins ==
- In March 1997, on the bank of the Hun river in Qingshuihe County, Inner Mongolia, a jar of cash coins weighing 7 kilograms was unearthed. The jar contained over 30 Zhouyuan Tongbao cash coins among other coins, with the Jurchen-led Jin dynasty period Dading Tongbao (大定通寶) being the latest. The cash coins stored in the jar are well preserved because they were buried in an arid and less rainy area.

== See also ==
- Kangxi Tongbao, also known as "Arhat money".

== Sources ==
- Hartill, David (2005). Cast Chinese Coins. Trafford, UK.
- Hartill, David (2020). Cast Chinese Amulets.
