= Xin dynasty coinage =

System of ancient Chinese coinage

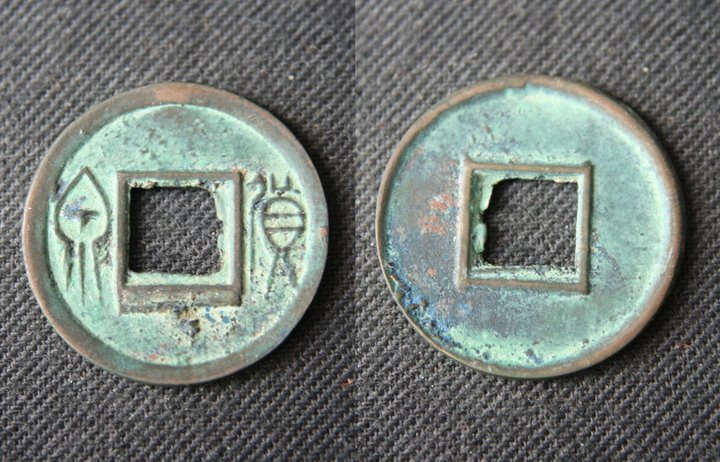
A Huo Quan (貨泉) cash coin

Xin dynasty coinage (Traditional Chinese: 新朝貨幣) was a system of ancient Chinese coinage that replaced the Wu Zhu cash coins of the Han dynasty and was largely based on the different types of currencies of the Zhou dynasty, including knife money and spade money. During his brief reign, Wang Mang introduced a total of four major currency reforms which resulted in 37 different kinds of money consisting of different substances (tortoiseshell, cowries, gold, silver, copper), different patterns (knife, spade, coin), and different denominations (values of 1, 10, 20, 30, 40, 50, 100, 200, 300, 400, 500, 600, 700, 800, 900, and 1,000).

Eventually Wang Mang was forced to abolish the revived Zhou dynasty coinages in favour of cash coins. But after the fall of the Xin dynasty, the restored Han dynasty reintroduced the Wu Zhu cash coins, but the Huo Quan (貨泉) cash coins introduced during the Xin dynasty would continue to be produced for some time after its fall.

== History ==
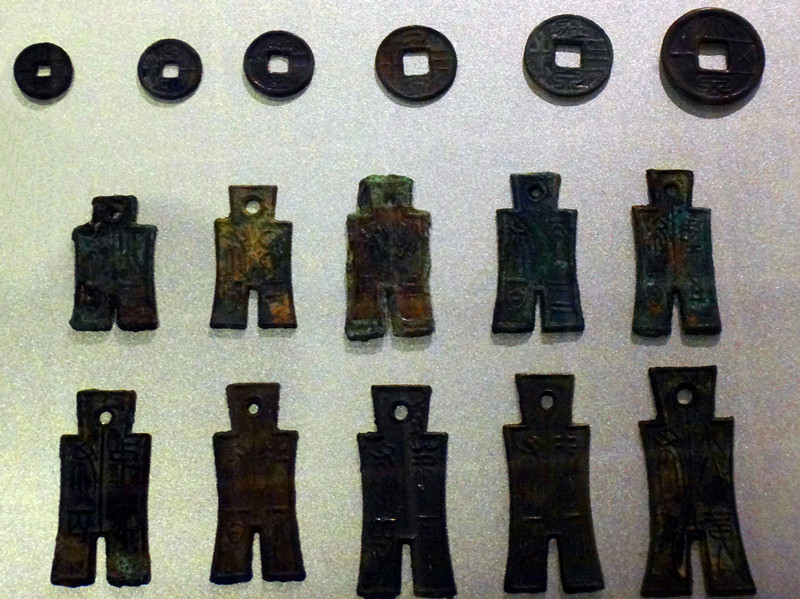
The 6 round coins and 10 spades introduced during the second monetary reform of Wang Mang.

=== First monetary reforms ===
Wang Mang was a nephew of the Dowager Empress Wang. In AD 9, he usurped the throne, and founded the Xin dynasty. He introduced a number of currency reforms which met with varying degrees of success.

Many of the newly introduced currencies under Wang Mang had denominations that did not reflect the intrinsic value of the currency. As an example, a monetary piece may have had a nominal value of 1000 Wu Zhu cash coins had only an intrinsic value of three or four Wu Zhu cash coins. In his attempt to restore the ancient institutions of the Zhou dynasty, Wang Mang had issued many different types of money in very many forms.

Because of the unrealistically high nominal value of the money issued under Wang Mang, many Chinese people had turned to casting their own coinages as a response, in order to minimise their losses. As a countermeasure, however, Wang Mang issued edicts that stipulated very strict punishments for those who were caught privately casting coins during his reign.

The first reform, in AD 7, retained the Wu Zhu series of cash coins, but reintroduced two versions of the knife money:

Wang Mang era knife money
Description	Image
Yi Dao Ping Wu Qian (Chinese: 一刀平五千; pinyin: yīdāo píng wǔqiān; lit. 'One Knife Worth Five Thousand') on which the Yi Dao characters are inlaid in gold.	
Qi Dao Wu Bai (Chinese: 契刀五百; pinyin: qì dāo wǔbǎi; lit. 'Inscribed Knife Five Hundred')	

Unlike the Yi Dao Ping Wu Qian knives, the inscription of the Qi Dao Wu Bai knives aren't inlaid with gold. The nominal value of the Qi Dao Wu Bai knives was 500 Wu Zhu cash coins.

=== Second monetary reforms ===
Between AD 9 and 10 he introduced an impossibly complex system involving tortoise shell, cowries, gold, silver, six round copper coins, and a reintroduction of the spade money in ten denominations.

The Six Coins (六泉). AD 9–14.

- Xiao Quan Zhi Yi (Chinese: 小泉直一; pinyin: xiǎoquán zhí yī; lit. 'Small Coin', 'Value One')
- Yao Quan Yi Shi (Chinese: 么泉一十; pinyin: yǎo quán yīshí; lit. 'Baby Coin', 'Ten')
- You Quan Er Shi (Chinese: 幼泉二十; pinyin: yòu quán èrshí; lit. 'Juvenile Coin', 'Twenty')
- Zhong Quan San Shi (Chinese: 中泉三十; pinyin: zhōng quán sānshí; lit. 'Middle Coin', 'Thirty')
- Zhuang Quan Si Shi (Chinese: 壯泉四十; pinyin: zhuàng quán sìshí; lit. 'Adult Coin', 'Forty')
- Da Quan Wu Shi (Chinese: 大泉五十; pinyin: dàquán wǔshí) is a round coin with a nominal value of fifty Wu Zhu.

The "Small Coin, Value One" and "Large Coin, Fifty" cash coins are fairly common, but all the other cash coins of the "six coins" are rare today. The Daquan Wushi (大泉五十, "Large Coin, Fifty") exists in many sizes and varieties. Some rarer Daquan Wushi have a si chu (四出) design, this design has four outward lines extending from the square centre hole towards the outer rim.

The Ten Spades (十布). AD 10–14.

- Xiao Bu Yi Bai (Chinese: 小布一百; pinyin: xiǎo bù yībǎi; lit. 'Small Spade', 'One Hundred')
- Yao Bu Er Bai (Chinese: 么布二百; pinyin: yǎo bù èrbǎi; lit. 'Baby Spade', 'Two Hundred')
- You Bu San Bai (Chinese: 幼布三百; pinyin: yòu bù sānbǎi; lit. 'Juvenile Spade', 'Three Hundred')
- Xu Bu Si Bai (Chinese: 序布四百; pinyin: xù bù sìbǎi; lit. 'Ordered Spade', 'Four Hundred')
- Cha Bu Wu Bai (Chinese: 差布五百; pinyin: chà bù wǔbǎi; lit. 'Servant Spade', 'Five Hundred')
- Zhong Bu Liu Bai (Chinese: 中布六百; pinyin: zhōng bù liùbǎi; lit. 'Middle Spade', 'Six Hundred')
- Zhuang Bu Qi Bai (Chinese: 壯布七百; pinyin: zhuàng bù qībǎi; lit. 'Adult Spade', 'Seven Hundred')
- Di Bu Ba Bai (Chinese: 第布八百; pinyin: dì bù bābǎi; lit. 'Graduate Spade', 'Eight Hundred')
- Ci Bu Jiu Bai (Chinese: 次布九百; pinyin: cì bù jiǔbǎi; lit. 'Lower Spade', 'Nine Hundred')
- Da Bu Heng Qian (Chinese: 大布衡千; pinyin: dà bù héng qiān; lit. 'Large Spade', 'Weight One Thousand')

The Chinese seal script characters in the inscriptions of these spades are read in the following order: top right, top left, bottom right, bottom left. This denomination of this spade money was equivalent to their face value in Wu Zhu cash coins.

According to the History of Han:

The people became bewildered and confused, and these coins did not circulate. They secretly used Wu Zhu coins for their purchases. Wang Mang was very concerned at this and issued the following decree:

Those who dare to oppose the court system and those who dare to use Wu Zhus surreptitiously to deceive the people and equally the spirits will all be exiled to the Four Frontiers and be at the mercy of devils and demons.

The result of this was that trade and agriculture languished, and food became scarce. People went about crying in the markets and the highways, the numbers of sufferers being untold.

- David Hartill - Cast Chinese Coins (September 22, 2005).

=== Third monetary reforms ===
In AD 14, all these tokens were abolished, and replaced by another type of spade coin and new round coins.

- Huo Bu (Chinese: 貨布; pinyin: huò bù; lit. 'Money Spade')
- Huo Quan (Chinese: 貨泉; pinyin: huòquán; lit. 'Wealth/Money Coin')

==== Huo Bu spades ====
The inscription of the Huo Bu is read from right to left with the seal script on the right is "Huo" (貨) which translates as "Money" and the character on the left is "Bu" (布) which translates as "Spade". The Wang Mang era spades have a lot of similarities with the spade money cast during the Warring States period. A major difference between this spade money and the earlier Zhou dynasty version is the addition of the hole at the top of the spade.

These spade coins had the nominal value (or "equivalent value") of 25 cash coins.

==== Huo Quan cash coins ====
The most common form of money produced during the Wang Mang era in Chinese history is the Huo Quan (貨泉) series of cash coins which exists in many different varieties, sizes, and weights. The smallest specimens of Huo Quan cash coins can weigh less than 2 grams while the heaviest of this series can weigh between 10 and 20 grams or more. The very light Huo Quan coins were probably privately cast cash coins, as had happened earlier with the lighter Wu Zhu cash coins during the Han dynasty.

The heavier Huo Quan cash pieces were most likely produced during the final few years of the Wang Mang reign. Most of these heavier Huo Quan cash have been excavated in an area east of Baoji, Shanxi and west of the city of Xi'an, Shanxi (which known in more ancient times as Chang'an, which for a long time was the capital of imperial China). Because these heavier Huo Quan cash coins tend to bulge outward, they are popularly referred to as "cake money" or "biscuit money" in China. The designs of these cash coins are not very uniform and they tend to differ drastically in size, weight, as well as in Chinese calligraphy. These more heavy "cake coins" would probably not have been valued the same on the market as the standard Huo Quan cash coins in contemporary on the market. Their actual value was probably determined according to their weight as opposed to any written denominations.

Specimens of Huo Quan cash coins exist which are made of iron or iron-alloys. Some of these Huo Quan cash coins tend to have no inscription at all. Others Huo Quan cash coins exist as two cash coins that are joined because during their production process they were never chiselled apart from each other after being removed from the coin mould.

According to Schjöth, Wang Mang wished to displace the Wu Zhu currency of the Western Han, owing, it is said, to his prejudice to the jin (Chinese: 金; pinyin: jīn; lit. 'gold') radical in the character zhu (Chinese: 銖; pinyin: zhū) of this inscription, which was a component part of the character Liu, the family name of the rulers of the House of Han, whose descendant Wang Mang had just dethroned. And so he introduced the Huo Quan currency. One of the reasons, again, that this coin circulated for several years into the succeeding dynasty was, so the chroniclers say, the fact that the character quan (Chinese: 泉; pinyin: quán) in the inscription consisted of the two component parts bai (Chinese: 白; pinyin: bái; lit. 'white') and shui (Chinese: 水; pinyin: shuǐ; lit. 'water'), which happened to be the name of the village, Bai Shui in Henan, in which the Emperor Guang Wu, who founded the Eastern Han, was born. This circumstance lent a charm to this coin and prolonged its time of circulation.

=== Fourth monetary reforms ===
- Bu Quan (Chinese: 布泉; pinyin: bù quán; lit. 'Spade Coin') was the third type of (what is classified as a form of) "spade money" introduced during these monetary reforms, this coin was the "Spade Coin". Despite their name, these coins aren't shaped like the other forms of Wang Mang era spade money. However, this "Spade coin" is actually a traditional Chinese cash coin (having a round shape with a square centre hole).

The Bu Quan cash coins were known later as the Nan Qian (Chinese: 男錢; pinyin: nán qián; lit. 'Male Cash'), from the belief that if a woman wore this on her sash, she would give birth to a boy.

The Bu Quan cash coins today are not as rare as the earlier Wang Mang spade coins.

=== Aftermath ===
Eventually, Wang Mang's unsuccessful reforms provoked an uprising, and he was killed by rebels in AD 23. The Huo Quan did indeed continue to be minted after the death of Wang Mang – a mould dated AD 40 is known.

== List of Xin dynasty cash coins by inscription ==
List of cash coins issued by the Xin dynasty:

Inscription	Traditional Chinese	Hanyu pinyin	Literal translation	Years of production	Emperor	Image
The Six Round Coins (series 9–14)
Xiao Quan Zhi Yi	小泉直一	xiǎoquán zhí yī	"Small Coin, Value One"	9–14	Wang Mang	
Yao Quan Yi Shi	么泉一十	yǎo quán yīshí	"Baby Coin, Ten"	9–14	Wang Mang	
You Quan Er Shi	幼泉二十	yòu quán èrshí	"Juvenile Coin, Twenty"	9–14	Wang Mang	
Zhong Quan San Shi	中泉三十	zhōng quán sānshí	"Middle Coin, Thirty"	9–14	Wang Mang	
Zhuang Quan Si Shi	壯泉四十	zhuàng quán sìshí	"Adult Coin, Forty"	9–14	Wang Mang	
Da Quan Wu Shi	大泉五十	dàquán wǔshí	"Large coin with a nominal value of fifty (Wu Zhu cash coins)"	9–14	Wang Mang	
Later issues
Huo Quan	貨泉	huòquán	"Wealth/Money Coin"	14–23	Wang Mang	
Bu Quan	布泉	bù quán	"Spade Coin"	14–23	Wang Mang	

== Manufacturing process ==
During the Xin dynasty period its government adopted the "Stack casting" (疊鑄) method of producing cash coins. "Stack casting" is a method of cash coin casting where large quantities of identical coin moulds were placed together in a way that they were all connected to a single common casting gate, this allowed for a very large quantity of objects to be manufactured in only a single casting session, saving time, labour power, metal, materials for fuel, and refractory material.

The adoption of this casting method allowed for the government to produce more cash coins, as during the Xin dynasty a single cast could produce 184 cash coins, a number which wasn't possible to have been achieved with the earlier "Upright Casting" (板范豎式澆鑄) technique of manufacturing cash coins.

== Controversial Wang Mang era coinages ==
During the Wang Mang era there are two different forms of currency created during this period which had been debated among Chinese coin collectors because of some issues which make them controversial.

=== Guobao Jinkui Zhiwan ===
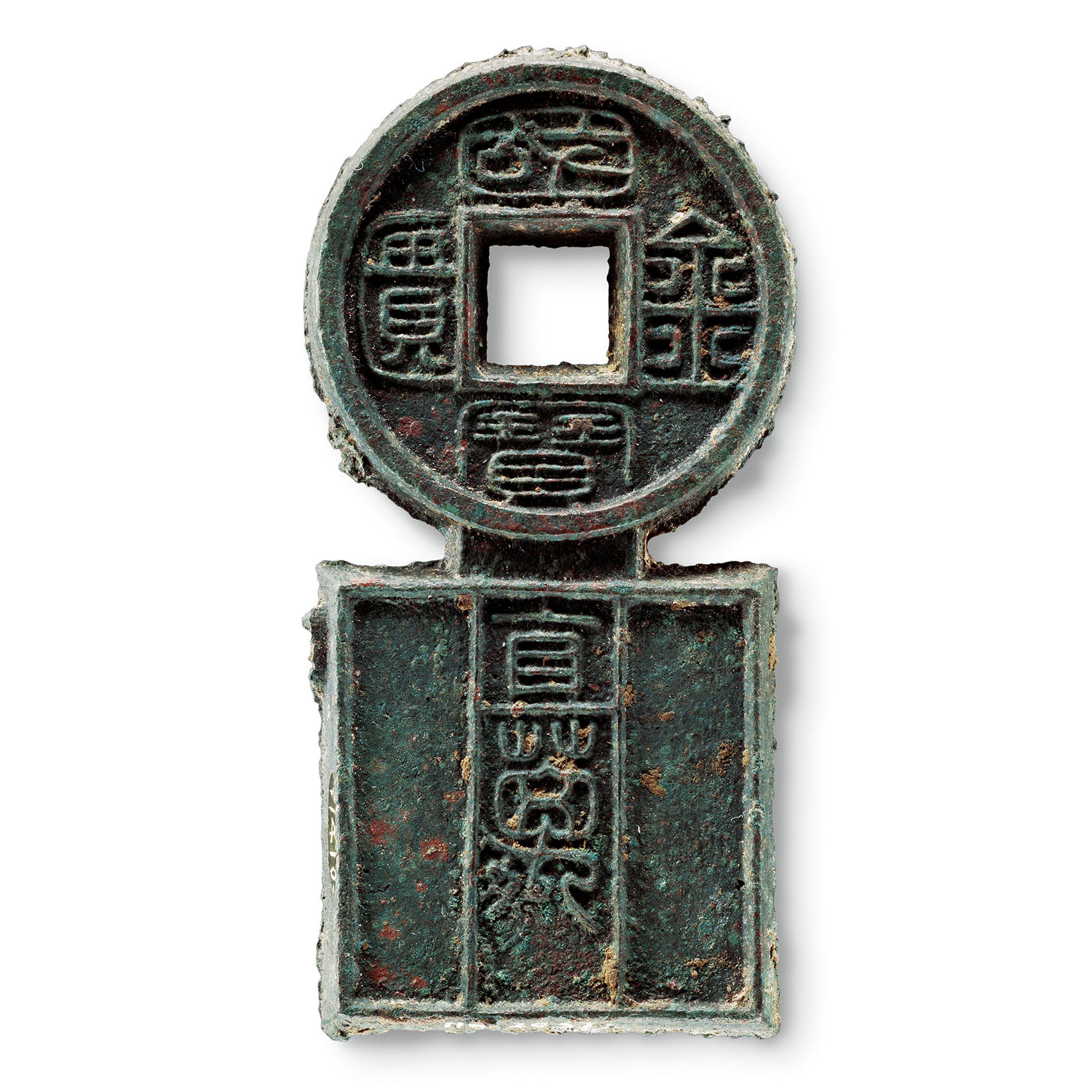
A Guobao Jinkui Zhiwan (國寶金匱直萬) coin held in the collection of the National Museum of China in Beijing.

The Guobao Jinkui Zhiwan (traditional Chinese: 國寶金匱直萬; simplified Chinese: 国宝金匮直万; pinyin: guó bǎo jīn kuì zhí wàn, "National treasure gold deficiency, value ten thousand") is a piece of coinage usually attributed to Wang Mang, it's a piece of currency that resembles neither a traditional Chinese cash coin nor any other type of ancient Chinese currency shape such as a spade or knife. The Guobao Jinkui Zhiwan coinage has a round top portion and a square lower portion. The inscription "Guobao Jinkuo" surrounding the square hole located at the top portion is written in a rather unusual order going first top, then left, then right, and then bottom.

There are two Chinese seal script characters located on the lower part of the Guobao Jinkui Zhiwan piece which are read from top to bottom as Zhiwan (直萬), which translates into English "value ten thousand". Some Chinese numismatists hypothesise that this piece was not intended to be a form of circulating money but rather as an emblem symbolising that Emperor Wang Mang was in the possession of several 10,000 jin of gold. Meanwhile, other Chinese numismatists hypothesise that the Guobao Jinkui Zhiwan really was intended to be a form of money, but that because its stated face value was so large it never officially circulated in China.

It is not known how many authentic Guobao Jinkui Zhiwan pieces there actually are, as the number of fake pieces seems to be unlimited, some Chinese numismatic reference books mention only a single authentic piece being known to exist, while other Chinese numismatic reference sources state that there exist two known Guobao Jinkui Zhiwan pieces, while other Chinese numismatic sources mention the existence of two whole pieces and a half piece. The "half" piece mentioned by these sources apparently only refers to one specimen for which only the top portion exists, while the "bottom half" is still missing.

One reference book states that one of the specimens was unearthed in the year 1921 in a field somewhere northwest of the city of Xi'an, Shanxi (which was formerly known as Chang'an in imperial China), the former site of central government offices at the end of the Han dynasty.

=== Xinbu Shiyi Zhu ===
The second piece of Wang Mang currency that currently remains embroiled in controversy among Chinese numismatists and Chinese coin collectors is a coin that has the inscription Xinbu Shiyi Zhu (traditional Chinese: 新布十一銖; simplified Chinese: 新布十一铢; pinyin: xīn bù shí yī zhū, "new spade eleven zhu"). Of this coin the only known authentic example of it is located at the National Museum of China in the city of Beijing.

Some Chinese numismatists are suspicious that the Xinbu Shiyi Zhu is in fact fake, they believe this because the Chinese calligraphy is different from any other Wang Mang era coinage and also the coin has four diagonal lines (Chinese: 四出; pinyin: sì chū) that extend from the four corners of the square centre hole.

== Chinese charms based on Xin dynasty coinage ==
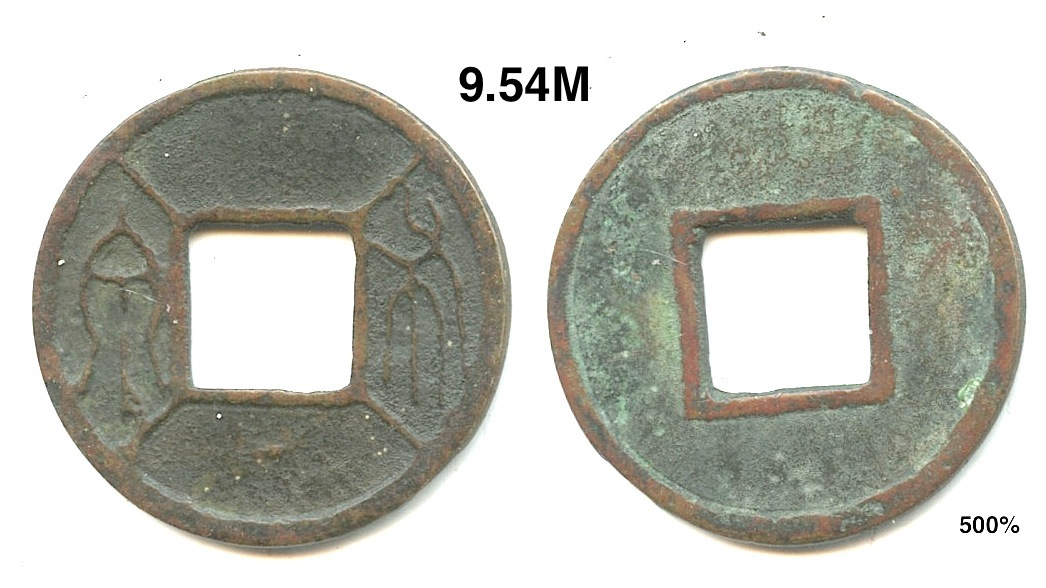
A Huo Quan charm (貨泉花錢) produced during the Ming or Manchu Qing dynasty, thess charms were typically used as clothing accessories.

Huo Quan cash coins, like the earlier Ban Liang, San Zhu, and Wu Zhu cash coins reflected the early emergence of Chinese numismatic charms as a number of them contained marks that resemble "stars", "suns", and "moons".

The inscription of Huo Quan cash coins is read from right to left and they were cast beginning in the year 14 AD. Like the later Bingqian, some heave Huo Quan cash coins have four diagonal lines protruding (or radiating) from the corners of the square centre hole of the coin, while uniquely to these cash coins, they can have large blobs situated both above and below the square centre hole. It is suspected that these Wang Mang era Bingqian might be an early form of Chinese numismatic charms, but the exact meaning of these symbols remain to be discovered. Huo Quan Bingqian can have a diameter of 23.3 millimeters and a weight of 7 grams, making them heavier than the standard issue Huo Quan cash coins.

Because of their distinctive shapes and designs the various Xin dynasty coinages served as inspiration for many different types of Chinese numismatic charms for millennia after the fall of the Xin dynasty.

=== Chinese numismatic charms based on Xin dynasty spade money ===
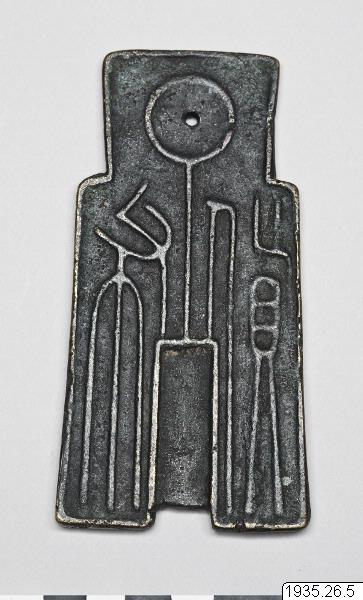
A Chinese spade charm based on a Wang Mang's Xin dynasty era spade coin on display at the Museum of Ethnography, Sweden.

One of the more distinctive shapes of Chinese numismatic charms is based on Wang Mang's spade money. These spade charms tend to be very similar to the Wang Mang era spade money, but may contain different inscriptions and designs. On the obverse and reverse sides of some of these spade charms a major feature is that they have a double line rim on its outer edge and down the centre. The Wang Mang spades upon which these spade charms are based use only a single line for its outer rim and centre inner line.

During the early years of the Republic of China sometime after 1911 (or possibly in Japan) a new type of Chinese spade charm was created. It has the same Chinese seal script inscription "Huo Bu" (貨布) as the original Wang Mang spade coin upon which these numismatic charms based. These spade charms are much, much bigger in size than the original spade money. Just above the Chinese seal script characters is an illustration of the seven star "Big Dipper" constellation. On these charms there is an image of a snake on the lower right foot of the spade as well as a "three-legged toad" located on the left foot.

The reverse side of these charms have the "sun" (the dot) and "moon" (represented by a crescent) at the upper left area of the spade. At the upper right part of these pieces are three stars that are connected by a line, these three stars refer to the Sanxing. There are also two "human (or humanoid) figures" on these charms that are of unknown origin and its not clear which people (or deities) they represent. On the right foot of these spade charms there may be a heron (or an egret).

== Hoards of Xin dynasty coins ==
- On June 15, 2011, it was reported that the Guangzhou Cultural Relics Archaeological Research Institute had unearthed a pile of 1,000 cash coins while excavating an Eastern Han dynasty period grave in Guangzhou, Guangdong. The discovered cash coins are all Xin dynasty period cash coins with the inscription Daquan Wushi (大泉五十). The Eastern Han dynasty grave is 8.2 meters in length and 5.02 meters in width. Other than the cash coins, the archaeologists had also discovered nearly a hundred other objects inside of the grave including a bronze mirror, pottery, coloured tile, as well as different types of ornaments and jewelry made of jade and agate.
- On 16 July 2012 a large cache of 14,000 ancient Chinese coins was found in Kuqa, Xinjiang which included Han dynasty era Wu Zhu (五銖) and "Chiseled rim Wu Zhu" (鑿邊五銖) cash coins, Xin dynasty era Huo Quan (貨泉) and Daquan Wushi (大泉五十) cash coins, a Three Kingdoms period Taiping Baiqian (太平百錢) cash coins, as well as native cash coins. Alongside the cash coins were shards of pottery as well as fragments of human bones which lead the archeologists believe that this was an old cemetery.
- It was announced on January 18, 2016, by the Research Center of Dolmens in Northeast Asia that over fifty Huo Quan (貨泉, 화천, hwacheon) cash coins cast under Wang Mang that were bundled together were unearthed inside of a tomb that is located in Gwangju, Jeollanam-do, South Korea. There is minor evidence that these coins might've been used for the international trade of the time.
- It was reported on Thursday 3 March 2016 by China.org.cn that local newspapers had covered a story on Tuesday 1 March 2016 where a villager surnamed Zhang in Nanzuo Village, Xingping, Shaanxi had unearthed 459 kilograms of Xin dynasty cash coins. While Mr. Zhang was levelling the land on Saturday 27 February 2016 with a spade, after digging for about half a meter he had discovered the coins. All of the discovered Wang Mang period copper-alloy coins have centre holes and can further be subdivided into three kinds, some have square centre holes, others have rectangular centre holes, and others had round ones. After the local police was called, a local police officer with the cultural relics inspection detachment named Feng Pengru had told the Xinhua News Agency that they were all produced during the Xin dynasty. After the cash coins that were found in Nanzuo Village were cleaned and evaluated from the site by a team of archaeologists. Afterwards they were given to the local museum.
- On Monday 13 November 2017, the Henan Cultural Relics Department announced that an excavation near Zhoukou, Henan had unearthed a large number of tombs and cash coins that date to the Han dynasty period. Over 120 different tombs were discovered, of which 105 dated to the Han dynasty period and 15 to the Song dynasty and Qing dynasty periods. Most of the cash coins unearthed at the site were Wu Zhu (五銖) cash coins, while also a number of Xin dynasty spade coins issued under Wang Mang, and Song dynasty cash coins were also found in a number of tombs.

== Sources ==
- Hartill, David (2005). Cast Chinese Coins. Trafford, UK: Trafford Publishing. ISBN 978-1412054669.
- Wang, Helen (1997). "The Reverend Ernest S. Box. An Englishman's Collection of Chinese Coins". The Oriental Ceramic Society Newsletter. Oriental Ceramic Society.

Preceded by: Wu Zhu cash coins Reason: Collapse of the Han dynasty.	Currency of China; 9 – 23	Succeeded by: Wu Zhu cash coins Reason: Restoration of the Han dynasty.
