= Bingqian =

Chinese numismatic term

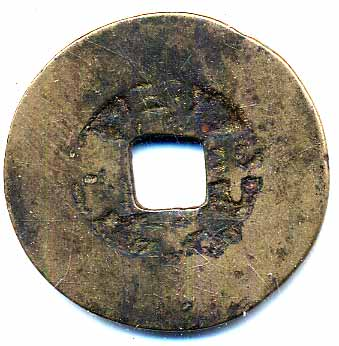
A Xianping Yuanbao (咸平元寶) biscuit coin.

Bingqian (traditional Chinese: 餅錢; simplified Chinese: 饼钱; pinyin: bǐng qián), or Bingxingqian (traditional Chinese: 餅型錢; simplified Chinese: 饼型钱; pinyin: bǐng xíng qián), is a term, which translates into English as "biscuit coins", "pie coins", or "cake coins", (Note: Alternatively, they could be translated into English as "biscuit money", "pie money", or "cake money".) used by mainland Chinese and Taiwanese coin collectors to refer to cash coins with an extremely broad rim, as these cash coins can be very thick. However, the earliest versions of the Bingqian did not have extraordinarily broad rims.

These cash coins were produced during two distinct periods in Chinese history, first they were produced under Emperor Wang Mang of the Xin dynasty and later again during the reign of Emperor Zhenzong of the Northern Song dynasty. Only a very small quantity of Chinese cash coins were ever produced that had these very broad rims and/or had a very thick composition.

While there have been speculations about their use, the purpose of these broad rimmed cash coins have yet to be determined.

== Xin dynasty ==
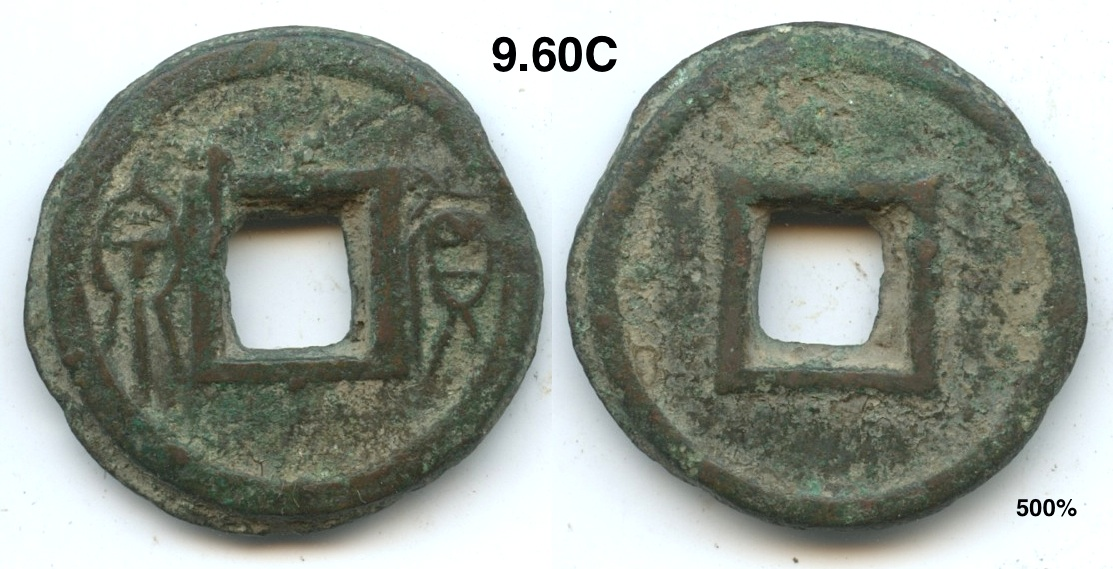
A Huo Quan (貨泉) biscuit coin.

The first instance of Bingqian had been produced under the reign of Emperor Wang Mang of the Xin dynasty. He reigned between the years 7 and 23 AD and during this era Huo Quan (貨泉) cash coins which are commonly referred to as Binqian were produced, these cash coins were both heavy in weight and thick in their composition, but differed from the later Song dynasty era Bingqian in that their rims were not significantly broader than those of other cash coins.

The inscription of Huo Quan cash coins is read from right to left and they were cast beginning in the year 14 AD. They also notably use a different calligraphic style than the ones found on Western Han dynasty cash coins, which is believed to have been pioneered on these Bingqian. Uncharacteristically, the characters on Huo Quan Bingqian appear in various forms, implicitly covering the concept of "format" (版式) that was used in later dynasties, meaning that the calligraphic styles of these Bingqian can be considered to be a breakthrough for the development of currency culture. Like the later Bingqian, some heave Huo Quan cash coins have four diagonal lines protruding (or radiating) from the corners of the square centre hole of the coin, while uniquely to these cash coins, they can have large blobs situated both above and below the square hole in the center. It is suspected that these Wang Mang era Bingqian might be an early form of Chinese numismatic charms, but the exact meaning of these symbols remain to be discovered.

Regular Huo Quan cash coins tend to have a weight of 3 grams. Huo Quan Bingqian can have a diameter of 23.3 millimeters and a weight of 7 grams, making them heavier than the standard issue Huo Quan cash coins. The largest Huo Quan Bingqian can weigh more than 15 grams.

== Song dynasty ==
During the reign of Emperor Zhenzong of the Northern Song dynasty, the era names of Xianping (咸平, 998–1003), Jingde (景德, 1004–1007), Dazhong Xiangfu (大中祥符, 1008–1016), and Tianxi (天禧, 1017–1021) were used. Despite these four different reign titles being used during the reign of Emperor Zhenzong, the only known Bingqian from this era contain the inscriptions Xianping Yuanbao (咸平元寶) and Xiangfu Yuanbao (祥符通寶), while no authentic Bingqian with the legends Jingde Yuanbao (景德元寶), Xiangfu Tongbao (祥符通寶), and Tianxi Tongbao (天禧通寶) have ever been recorded. Bingqian have been the subject of works written by notable Chinese numismatic scholars such as Ma Dingxiang (馬定祥) and Dai Baoting (戴葆庭), who have all created different hypotheses about both their origin and function, but why these thicker and heavier cash coins were created remains to be discovered.

There are a far fewer number of Xiangfu Yuanbao Bingqian recorded than Bingqian versions of Xianping Yuanbao cash coins. The most common Xianping Yuanbao cash coins have a thickness between 2.14 – 2.6 millimeters and they tend to have a weight between 2.2 – 5.8 grams, while a Bingqian versionq of the Xianping Yuanbao can have a diameter as wide as 46.7 millimeters and weight as heavy as 73.2 grams. The largest recorded Xianping Yuanbao Bingqian has a diameter of 66 millimeters.

Because Bingqian are thick, they are sometimes confused for mother coins, this is not only because of both their heavier build and in some cases their deeper cut characters. While in the year 2019 a "normal" Xianping Yuanbao was valued only at 2 yuan, a Bingqian Xianping Yuanbao cash coin during this same time was valued at 500 yuan on average.

Many Bingqian have been discovered in the province of Sichuan, and it's likely that they originated from this region.

These heavy cash coins with wide rims are not standardised in both their size and their weight, which means that a large variety of Bingqian from this period have been recorded. It is currently unknown whether or not Bingqian actually circulated as an actual form of currency and what their contemporary value was.

It is currently unknown why these very heavy cash coins with broad rims were produced. Chinese numismatist Sun Zhonghui (simplified Chinese: 孙仲汇; traditional Chinese: 孫仲匯; pinyin: sūn zhòng huì) in his tGuqian Bitujie (古錢幣圖解) attributed these Bingqian with certainty to the Northern Song dynasty period. Furthermore, in Guqian Bitujie he hypothesised that the Bingqian were created in what is now known as Sichuan because the government of the Song dynasty had confiscated all copper items and circulating bronze cash coins, which resulted in a shortage of copper in the region. The government had then introduced iron cash coins, or tieqian (鐡錢), which had dramatically increased the purchasing power of the copper-alloy cash coins while decreasing the purchasing power of iron cash coins. At the time there were three mints operating in Sichuan producing iron cash coins.

Because large and heavy copper-alloy coins like these Bingqian would have had real monetary value in Sichuan at the time, Sun Zhonghui notes that the probability is quite likely that these extraordinarily large cash coins had circulated as a valid currency.

=== Variants ===
- Some Bingqian have what are called sì jué (四诀; 四訣) reverses, these reverses are found on some Song dynasty period cash coins, which means that these cash coins have the corners of their square centre hole extend somewhat outwards towards the rim of the cash coin.
- There have been Xianping Yuanbao Bingqian recorded with a diameter of 26.5 millimeters and a weight of 10.68 grams, 26.5 millimeters, 28.4 millimeters, a Xianping Yuanbao cash coin with a diameter of 30.1 millimeters and a thickness of 2.5 millimeters, one with a diameter of 32.5 millimeters, one with a diameter between 31 and 31.1 millimeters with a thickness between 4.5 and 4.53 millimeters, 34.0 millimeters, (Note: A specimen of this Xianping Yuanbao Bingqian was in the collection of the Chinese numismatist Sun Zhonghui (孫仲匯).) and a Xianping Yuanbao Bingqian with a diameter of 44.0 millimeters, a thickness of 6 millimeters, and a weight of 72.0 grams, this specimen further had si chu (四出, sì chū).
- There is a variant of the Bingqian known as "the double-folded cake coins" (折二饼钱; 折二餅錢; zhé èr bǐng qián).
- A Xiangfu Yuanbao Bingqian, which are significantly rarer than Xianping Yuanbao Bingqian, has been recorded with a diameter of 26.4 millimeters and was listed at an auction in the city of Shanghai in the year 2014.
- A Xianping Yuanbao with a diameter of 46.7 millimeters and a weight of 73.2 grams was sold at auction in the year 2013 for $2,623 (which at the time was 17,250 yuan).
- The largest Bingqian known to exist is a Xianping Yuanbao with a diameter of 66 millimeters. This cash coin was owned by the Chinese numismatist Ma Dingxiang (馬定祥), it was listed at an auction in the year 2008 with an estimated price of $9,124 – $15,207 (or between 60,000 – 100,000 yuan).

== Ming dynasty ==
During the Ming dynasty some Chongzhen Tongbao (崇禎通寶; 崇祯通宝 were produced, these cash coins have a diameter of 24 millimeters and a weight of 5.9 grams, as well as si jue (四訣), four lines on the reverse side of the coin radiating outward from the corners of the square-shaped hole in the middle.

== Qing dynasty ==
Some numismatists refer to the Qing dynasty period concept of Daqian (大錢) as "Bingqian" because of the coins' relatively increased size, making them resemble the Bingqian used by older dynasties.

== Sources ==
- Hartill, David (2005). Cast Chinese Coins: A Historical Catalogue. Trafford. ISBN 978-1-4120-5466-9.
- Ma Dingxiang (马定祥) - Ancient Chinese coins《历代古钱图说》, August 1999 (1999年8月). (in Mandarin Chinese).
- Peng Xinwei (彭信威) (1954 [2007]). Zhongguo huobi shi (中國貨幣史) (Shanghai: Qunlian chubanshe), 580–581, 597–605. (in Mandarin Chinese).
- Peng Xinwei (彭信威) (1994) A monetary history of China (translated by Edward H. Kaplan). Western Washington University (Bellingham, Washington).
- Sun Zhonghui (孫仲匯) - Guqian Bitujie (古錢幣圖解).
