= Han dynasty coinage =

Historical currencies of China

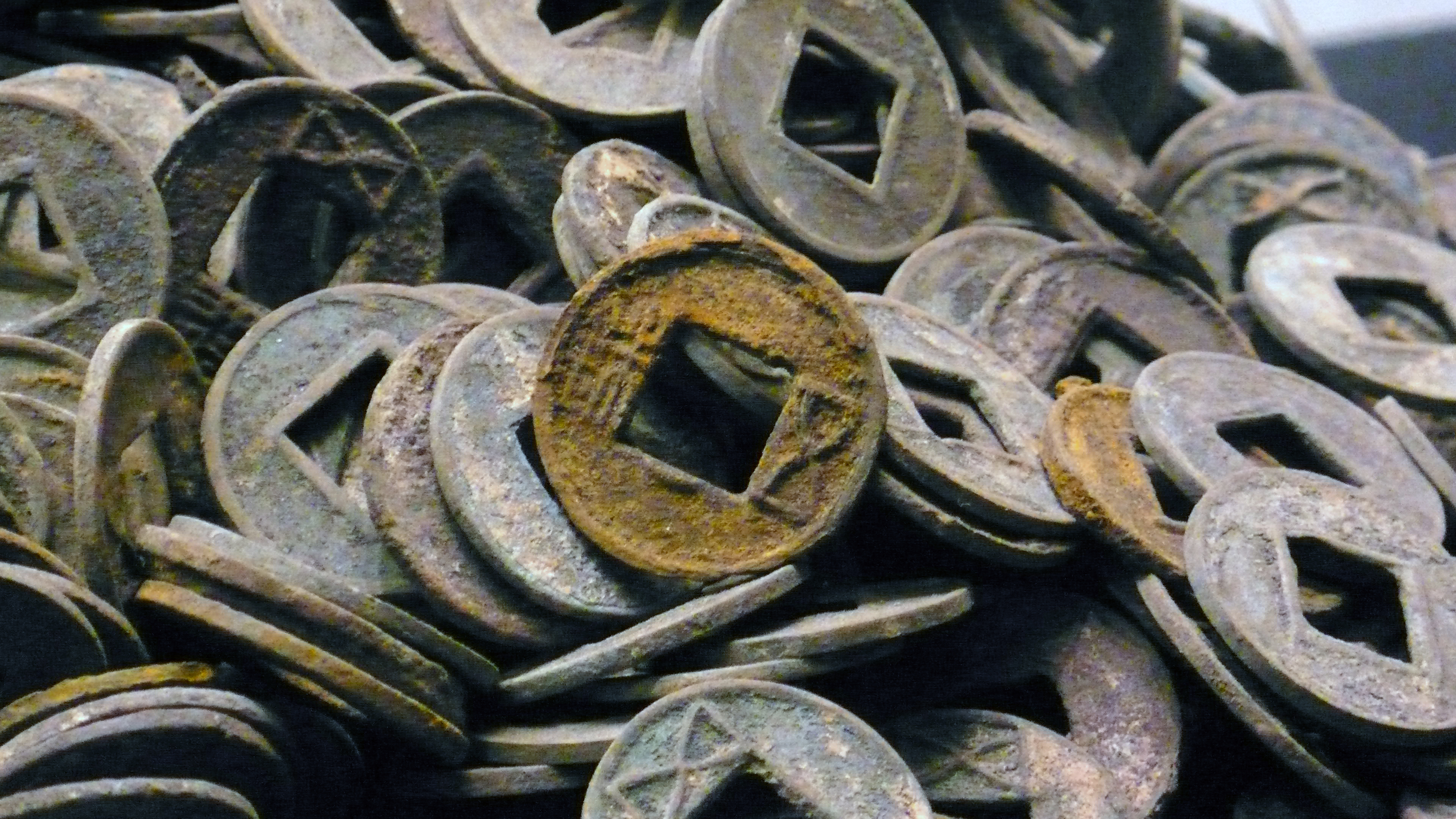
A large number of Wu Zhu (五銖) cash coins on display at the "Dazzling Life: Archaeological Finds of the Marquis of Haihun State in Han Dynasty. March 2, 2016 to June 2, 2016." (五色炫耀——南昌汉代海昏侯国考古成果展。2016年3月2日至6月2日，首都博物馆。) exhibition at the Capital Museum, Beijing.

The Han dynasty coinage (traditional Chinese: 漢朝貨幣; simplified Chinese: 汉朝货币; pinyin: Hàncháo Huòbì) system refers to the currency system of the Han dynasty, which ruled China from 202 BC until 9 AD, when it was overthrown by the Xin dynasty (see "Xin dynasty coinage"), and again from 25 AD until 220 AD. The most common coin used during the Han dynasty period was the bronze cash coin, while smaller quantities of gold coinages also circulated. During the reign of Emperor Wu in 119 BC a series silver-tin alloy coins was introduced, but due to both unforeseen inflationary effects and rampant counterfeiting it was withdrawn after circulating for only 4 years. The Han dynasty period saw an average annual production of 220,000,000 bronze cash coins minted (or 220,000 strings of 1,000 cash coins). The Han dynasty saw the introduction of the Wu Zhu (五銖) inscription on cash coins, which would be used for a total 736 years centuries after the end of the Han dynasty, until it was replaced by the Kaiyuan Tongbao (開元通寳) inscription in 621 AD during the Tang dynasty period.

During different periods, private coin production was permitted, while during other periods the government maintained a strict monopoly on the production of money. The quality of the coinage produced during the Han dynasty varies greatly partially due to these policies.

== Overview ==
During the Warring States period (403–221 BC), the development of private commerce, new trade routes, handicraft industries, and a money economy led to the growth of new urban centers. These centers were markedly different from the older cities, which had merely served as power bases for the nobility. The use of a standardised, nationwide currency during the Qin dynasty (221–206 BC) facilitated long-distance trade between cities. The Han dynasty would continue producing the cash coins of the Qin dynasty period and would sometimes enforce a state monopoly on the production of money and sometimes allow private persons to manufacture their own money according to government regulations. By this Western Han dynasty period, a full monetary economy had developed. Taxes, salaries, and fines were all paid in coins. An average of 220 million cash coins were produced a year.

In 119 BCE, the Ban Liang was replaced by the San Zhu (三銖, of weight approximately 2 g), and from 118 BCE, the Wu Zhu (五銖, around 3.25 g). First issued in 118 BC, this inscription was used on cash coins of many regimes both inside and outside of China over the next 700 years. Sometimes Wu Zhu cash coins can be specifically dated from dated moulds that have been discovered, or from their find spots, but the majority of cash coins with this inscription cannot. The Wu Zhu cash coins of the Western Han Dynasty have a square top to the 朱 component of "Zhu" (銖) character; on later Wu Zhu coins, this character is rounded.

The usurper Wang Mang, who founded the Xin dynasty (9–23 CE), reformed the currency, re-introducing spade and knife coins. Towards the end of his reign, he introduced the Huo Quan (貨泉), a cash coin of similar form to the Ban Liang but usually weighing around 3 g, to replace the Western Han period Wu Zhu coinage. The Huo Quan continued in circulation into the restored Eastern Han Dynasty (c. 23–220 CE), but Wu Zhu cash coins continued as the main copper-alloy coinage until the end of the 6th century CE long after the fall of the Han dynasty.

During the Western Han period the granaries in both the cities and the countryside were full and the government treasuries were running over with wealth. The History of Han claims that Chang'an (present-day Xi'an, Shaanxi) had stacked up hundreds of millions of strings of cash coins until the cords that had bound them together had rotted away and these numerous cash coins could no longer be counted.

Merchants and peasant farmers paid property and poll taxes in cash coins and land taxes with a portion of their crop yield. Peasants obtained coinage by working as hired labourers for rich landowners, in businesses like breweries or by selling agricultural goods and homemade wares at urban markets. The Han government may have found collecting taxes in coin the easiest method because the transportation of taxed goods would have been unnecessary.

Cash coins became the common measure of wealth during Eastern Han dynasty period, as many wages were paid solely in cash coins. Diwu Lun (第五倫) (fl. 40–85 AD), Governor of Shu Province (modern Sichuan), described his subordinate officials' wealth not in terms of landholdings, but in the form of aggregate properties worth approximately 10,000,000 cash coins. Commercial transactions involving hundreds of thousands of cash coins were commonplace.

During the Western Han dynasty period, on average, millet costs about 75 cash coins and polished rice 140 cash coins per hectolitre, a horse 4,400-4,500 cash coins. A labourer could be hired for a monthly salary of 150 cash coins; a merchant could earn 2,000 cash coins a month.

Angus Maddison estimates that the country's gross domestic product was equivalent to $450 per head in 1990 United States dollars—a sum that was above subsistence level, and which did not significantly change until the beginning of the Song dynasty in the late 10th century. Sinologist Joseph Needham has disputed this and claimed that China's GDP per capita exceeded Europe by substantial margins from the 5th century BCE onwards, holding that Han China was much wealthier than the contemporary Roman Empire. The widespread circulation of cash coins enriched many merchants, who invested their money in land and became wealthy landowners. The government's efforts to circulate cash had empowered the very social class which it actively tried to suppress through heavy taxes, fines, confiscations, and price regulation schemes.

== Copper coinages ==
=== Ban Liang ===
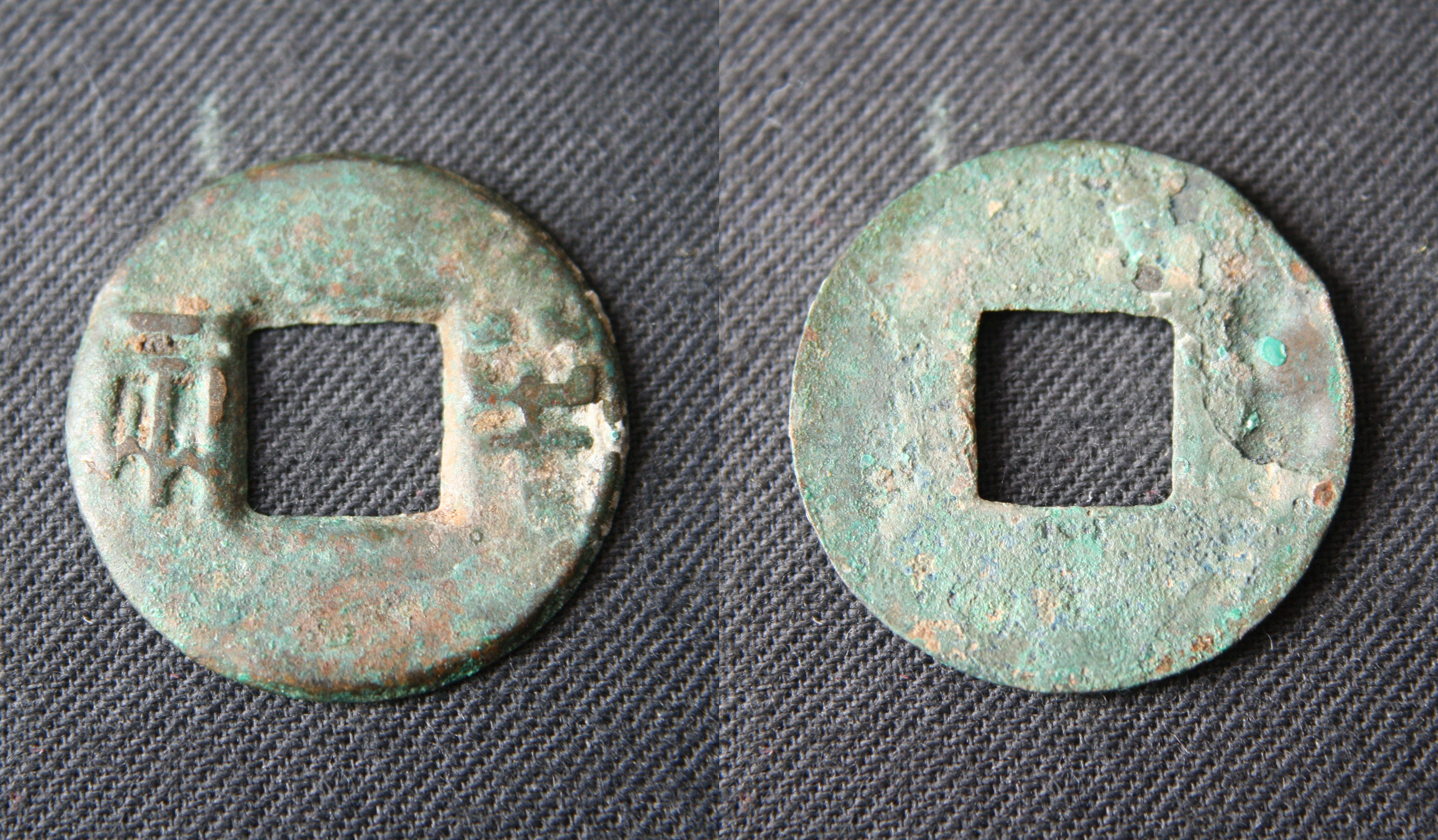
A Ban Liang (半兩) cash coin issued during the reign of Emperor Wen.

==== "Elm seed" Ban Liang ====
During the early Western Han period, founding Emperor Gaozu (r. 202–195 BC) closed government mints in favour of coin currency produced by the private sector. During these early days of the Western Han dynasty period the Qin dynasty period Ban Liang (半兩) cash coins were considered to be too heavy and inconvenient to use, this is because of their large sizes and weights (about 8 grams), so the imperial government permitted the private production of Ban Liang cash coins. These small privately cast cash coins are popularly known as "elm seed Ban Liang coins" (榆莢半兩錢, Yú jiá bàn liǎng qián). While officially these cash coins still had the inscription "Ban Liang" (meaning half of a tael), the reduction in size from the Qin to the "elm seed" variant went from an average of around 8 gram to only slightly more than a single gram. The heaviest "elm seed" Ban Liang cash coins had a weight of less than 2 grams, while the lightest of these coins weighed only about a quarter of a gram. Despite their greatly reduced weights these "elm seed" Ban Liang cash coins the conventional inscription of the previous dynasty, making their nominal (stated) value much greater than their intrinsic value. The "elm seed" cash coins were described as being "so light that the wind could carry them away".

==== 8 zhu Ban Liang ====
The tiny "elm seed" cash coins proved to be very disruptive to the economy, causing Gaozu's widow Empress Lü Zhi, as grand empress dowager, to issue an edict stipulating regulations that would create a new heavier bronze coin weighing 8 zhu (八銖半兩錢), approximately 4.8-5.3 grams. These new regulation Ban Liang cash coins had a diameter of around 26 to 30 millimeters and unlike the earlier Ban Liang cash coins had their inscriptions written in clerical script rather than in seal script. Empress Lü Zhi abolished private minting in 186 BC. She first issued a government-minted bronze coin weighing 5.7 g (0.20 oz).

The 8 zhu Ban Liang cash coins were cast in the same bronze moulds that were used in the final years of the Warring States period and cannot really be distinguished from the original coins. For this reason, the 8 zhu Ban Liang cash coins of Empress Lü Zhi are often misattributed to the Warring States period.

==== Wu Fen Ban Liang ====
During the 6th year of the reign of Empress Lü (182 BC) she ordered a new standard government Ban Liang cash coin with an official weight of 2.4 zhu, or about 1.5 g (0.053 oz). The reason for this change was that the 8 zhu coins were too expensive to continue producing. These 2.4 zhu Ban Liang cash coins are commonly referred to as "5 parts Ban Liang cash coins" (五分半兩錢, wǔ fēn bàn liǎng qián) because they were only one-fifth the size of an actual Qin period Ban Liang and typically only had a weight of around 1.5 grams. The change to the lighter coin caused widespread inflation.

Some variants of the wǔ fēn Ban Liang cash coins tend to have very broad outer rims, which includes their inscriptions protruding well above the surface of the square central hole.

To the ancient Chinese, these characteristics make the cash coin similar to the eyes of a snake, hence they are popularly referred to in China as "snake eye Ban Liang cash coins" (蛇目半兩錢, Shémù bàn liǎng qián). These "snake eye" coins typically have a diameter of around 23.4 millimeters and a weigh around 2.7 grams with the heaviest weighing 3.1 grams and the lightest 2.3 grams.

The reign of Empress Lü Zhi also saw the issuance an edict prohibiting private citizens from producing money, meaning that that counterfeiting had run rampant. During the reign of Emperor Wen this prohibition on the private production of currency was abolished. Private mints were required to mint cash coins weighing exactly 2.6 g (0.092 oz).

The legalisation wasn't universally accepted by everyone, as the former government official Jia Yi would argue against the reintroduction of competitive coinage, claiming that it would lead to debasement, and that a plethora of different types of privately minted cash coins would confuse the public resulting in the widespread manipulation of money exchanges. Therefore, Jia Yi argued that the restoration of the state monopoly of money production and government control over the copper supply were preferable. His propositions were rejected by the Han government.

==== 4 zhu Ban Liang ====
During the 5th year of the reign of Emperor Wen, the emperor ordered the creation of a new series of Ban Liang cash coins weighing 4 zhu. These 4 zhu Ban Liang cash coins (四銖半兩錢, Sì zhū bàn liǎng qián) typically are around 23 and 25 millimeters in diameters and weigh at most 3 grams. Private minting was legalised again, but private minters would now have adhere to strict government regulations on the weights and alloys of the coins.

One of the personally favourite officials of Emperor Wen, Senior Grand Master Deng Tong (鄧通), issued currency that is said to have "prevailed throughout the realm". Deng Tong was granted to exploit the revenue of a copper mine in Yandao (嚴道) in what is today Yingjing County, Sichuan, later he was allowed to produce Ban Liang cash coins for a total of 3 years and to bring "more happiness" (多福) to the people he added an extra bit of metal both above and below the square central hole to differentiate his privately cast 4 zhu Ban Liang cash coins from other 4 zhu Ban Liang cash coins. While Deng Tong was probably the wealthiest individual of Western Han dynasty period, he lost imperial favour under Emperor Jing causing the government to confiscate all of his assets and revenue leading him to die in poverty.

The 4 zhu Ban Liang cash coins would be produced for slightly over 50 years until the Ban Liang inscription was superseded by a new type of coin in the year Yuan Shou 4 (元狩四年, 119 BC).

A number of 4 zhu Ban Liang cash coins have an outer rim. A far fewer number of these cash coins contain both an outer rim as well as an inner rim around the square central hole. A number of 4 zhu ban liang coins display various markings such as dots, lines, numbers, and symbols (see "§ The emergence of Chinese numismatic charms" below). Some of these 4 zhu Ban Liang cash coins have their inscriptions reversed. A few rare specimens of this type also have additional Chinese characters present on the coins, such as Tài cháng (太常) and Shàng wèn (上問 / 上问).

=== San Zhu ===
The substantial difference between the nominal value and intrinsic value of Ban Liang series of cash coins during the Western Han dynasty period provided fertile ground for widespread counterfeiting. The markets and money exchanges of China did not accept the Ban Liang at their face value and they were traded based on their weight, rather than passively accepting the fictitious value of half a tael. For this reason in the year Yuan Shou 4 (119 BC) during the reign of Emperor Wu the San Zhu (三銖) series of cash coins was introduced to replace the earlier Ban Liang inscription. The term zhu (銖) means "grain". The "grain" was an ancient Chinese unit of weight equal to 100 grains of millet. San Zhu ("three grain" or "three zhu") cash coins typically weighed around 1.95 to 2 grams.

The San Zhu cash coins was issued either between 140-136 BC, or between 119-118 BC. The records are ambiguous on the dates of issue, but the later date is generally preferred by numismatists.

=== Wu Zhu ===
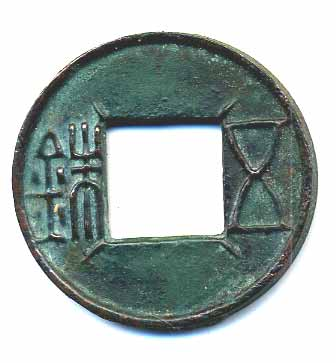
A Wu Zhu (五銖) cash coin with "4 horns", Fredrik Schjøth (余德) attributes this cash coin to Emperor Ling.

==== Introduction of the Wu Zhu ====
In the spring of the year Yuan Shou 5 (118 BC) during the reign of Emperor Wu the Wu Zhu (五銖) series of cash coins replaced the San Zhu. Large quantities of Wu Zhu cash coins were cast during the reign of the Han dynasty and Wu Zhu cash coins would continue to be manufactured throughout the dynasties that followed until they were finally replaced by the Kaiyuan Tongbao (開元通寳) series of cash coins in the year 621 AD at the beginning of the reign of Emperor Gaozu of the Tang dynasty. Despite the introduction of the new coinage, Ban Liang cash coins would continue to circulate alongside the new series.

Like Jia Yi before him, the prominent official Sang Hongyang was very skeptical of the private production of coinage and sought to reinstate a state monopoly over the manufacturing of currency. Sang Hongyang argued that if the government maintained the sole authority to produce money that "the people will not serve two masters" (implying both the state and the private market) and that a state monopoly would clear all doubts that the coinage in circulation was genuine and of sound quality. However, over 60 different mandarins from across the realm petitioned against the revocation of the freedom to produce money stating that the private production of cash coins is the most efficient method of supplying the people with sound coinage.

The mandarins argued that the private sector will be compelled by the market to maintain proper standards of size, weight, and purity as any bad currency would be rejected by the market. They claimed that a government monopoly would allow the imperial government to debase the currency with impunity.

Private minting was again abolished in 144 BC during the end of Emperor Jing's (r. 157–141 BC) reign. Private coining was made a crime and those convicted could face the death penalty. Despite this, the 2.6 g (0.092 oz) bronze coin was issued by both central and local commandery governments until 120 BC, when for one year it was replaced with a coin weighing 1.9 g (0.067 oz). Other currencies were introduced around this time. Token money notes made of embroidered white deerskin, with a face value of 400,000 cash coins, were used to collect government revenues.

==== Jun Guo Wu Zhu ====
118 BC the government of the Western Han dynasty ordered the Commanderies (君) and the Kingdoms (國) to cast Wu Zhu cash coins, which together with the imperial mint in Chang'an became the only institutions allowed to cast money. These cash coins are referred to in the Mandarin Chinese language as Jun Guo Wu Zhu (traditional Chinese: 君國五銖; simplified Chinese: 君国五铢; pinyin: Jūn guó wǔ zhū). As these mints were no longer in the habit of making reverse moulds and pairing them with the right molds, these first Wu Zhu and often have rough reverse sides. According to the History of Han the reverse sides of these Jun Guo Wu Zhu had a circular rim was added around the square central hole as a security feature against the scraping off of the metal. Additionally, many of these early Wu Zhu cash coins tended to have unfiled edges which resulted in them having a rough circumference. Neither the commanderies nor the kingdoms maintained strong quality controls on their mints resulting in these early Wu Zhu cash coins being very poorly made. The Jun Guo Wu Zhu cash coins constitute a very heterogeneous series of coinages, some of them have barely marked reverses while others have very high edges, some have internal edges that are square, others misshapen, some have curved corners. The Jun Guo Wu Zhu cash coins had a maximum diameter of 33.3 millimeters and a maximum weight of 5.8 grams.

The Jun Guo Wu Zhu cash coins are typically large and heavy, with the edges not filed. They are generally taken to be the earliest cash coins with the Wu Zhu inscription. Sometimes they have a rimless reverse.

Since commandery-issued cash coins were often of inferior quality and lighter weight, the central government closed all commandery mints in 113 BC and granted the central government's Superintendent of Waterways and Parks the exclusive right to mint cash coins. Although the issue of central government coinage was transferred to the office of the Minister of Finance (one of Nine Ministers of the central government) by the beginning of Eastern Han dynasty period, the central government's monopoly over the issue of coinage persisted.

==== Chi Ze Wu Zhu ====
In the year 115 BC, Emperor Wu ordered that a new series of Wu Zhu cash coins would be cast by the mints in the capital city which would nominally be equal to 5 regular cash coins. These cash coins are known as the Chi Ze Wu Zhu (赤仄五銖 / 赤仄五铢) (Note: The term Chize (赤仄) means "Red (or Shining) Edge" or purple edge since, after being removed from the mould, the edges of these coins were filed so that the copper colour of the bare metal showed through. Notably, the Chinese character "Wu" (五) on these cash coins tends to be composed of fairly straight lines.) and are alternatively known as Zhōng guān chì zè (鍾官赤仄 / 锺官赤仄). These Chi Ze cash coins typically have well made reverse sides as opposed to the more heterogenous Jun Guo Wu Zhu cash coins.

These cash coins are lighter than the Jun Guo versions, and have filed edges. Upon their introduction, only these were allowed to circulate. Specimens of this series were taken from the tomb of Liu Sheng, Prince of Zhongshan, who died in 113 BC.

==== Shang Lin San Guan Wu Zhu ====
In the year 113 BC the imperial government monopolised the production of money again and a new series of Wu Zhu cash coins started being produced by the Three Offices of Shang Lin (上林三官). (Note: This government agency is alternatively known in the English language as the "Three Offices of Shang Lin Park" (further reading: "Translation of Han dynasty titles"), the 3 component agencies of it were the Office for Coinage, Office for the Sorting of Copper, and the Office of Price Equalisation.) The coins produced by these 3 offices are known as the Shang Lin San Guan Wu Zhu (上林三官五銖, shàng lín sān guān wǔ zhū), which, unlike the Chi Ze Wu Zhu cash coins, did not have an unrealistic value of being equal to 5 regular cash coins, rather they only had the nominal value of a single cash coin. Most of these cash coins have a raised line above the square central hole on their obverse sides.

The quality of Shang Lin San Guan Wu Zhu cash coins was so high that forgery became unprofitable except to true artisans, great villains, or thieves. All earlier circulating cash coins were ordered by the government to be melted down and the copper taken to Shang Lin for the production of new cash coins.

Despite the monopolisation there were still government officials who expressed their dislike of the exclusive right to produce cash coins by the government. The mandarins argued what Sima Qian had argued decades before, namely that back during ancient times that people bartered and had no money, yet marketplaces still existed. Then during the Zhou dynasty period tortoise and cowrie shells, gold, and bronze coins would be introduced as media of exchange. The mandarins argued that these commodities were accepted by the market because of their scarcity, durability, and desirability. Meanwhile the later made cash coins largely derive their value from the fact that the emperor mandated them as valid currency, rather than based on the trust of the people.

==== Wu Zhu cash coins of the Eastern Han dynasty ====
In the year 9 Wang Mang usurped the throne and created the Xin dynasty (see "Xin dynasty coinage"), who reigned until the year 23 when the Han dynasty was restored. Following the restoration of the Han dynasty (known now as the "Eastern Han dynasty" in Chinese historiography) the production of Wu Zhu cash coins resumed. At first, the coins of Wang Mang and the Wu Zhu of the Western Han period were continued to be used. Once the widespread civil wars following Wang Mang's overthrow abated, the Wu Zhu cash coin was reintroduced by Emperor Guangwu (r. 25–57 AD) in 40 AD at the instigation of Ma Yuan (14 BC – 49 AD). The Emperor was advised that the foundation of the wealth of a country depends on a good political economy, which was found in the good old Wu Zhu coinage, and so the government reissued the Wu Zhu cash coins.

The Guangwu period Wu Zhu cash coins are characterised by a wide "Wu" (五) character, a "Zhu" (銖) character whose point is larger than on earlier Wu Zhu cash coins, the straight part of the "Zhu" character is further less geometric (without right angles) than on the coins of the Western Han dynasty period.

The Warlord Dong Zhuo moved the capital city from Luoyang to Chang'an in the year 190 and proceeded to melt down large bronze statues dating to the beginning of the Qin dynasty, the Twelve Metal Colossi, in order to manufacture small cash coins. Many of these cash coins produced by the warlord Dong Zhuo were so small that the Chinese would popularly refer to them as either "goose eye cash coins" (traditional Chinese: 鵝眼錢; simplified Chinese: 鹅眼钱; pinyin: É yǎn qián) or "chicken eye cash coins" (traditional Chinese: 雞目錢; simplified Chinese: 鸡目钱; pinyin: Jī mù qián). Despite their rather crude appearances, the Chinese characters present on these smaller coins are actually very well cast in high relief. A number of these diminutive cash coins bore the Wu Zhu inscription, but because of their small sized only the left half of the Chinese character "Wu" (五) and the right half of the "Zhu" (銖) character would actually fit on the coin. The "Zhu" character present to the left side of the square central hole is notably distinctive in the fact that the character extends from the top of the outer rim to its bottom. Note that this type of Wu Zhu cash coin is different from what Chinese people typically refer to as "chiselled rim cash coins" (traditional Chinese: 鑿邊錢; simplified Chinese: 凿边钱; pinyin: Záo biān qián), where a normal size Wu Zhu cash coin would have had its inside cut out in order to turn a single cash coin into two cash coins.

During the middle of the Eastern Han dynasty period ranging from the reigns of Emperor Ming to Emperor Huan there are only minor fundamental differences in terms of official calligraphic fonts. Besides the appearance of marks (bars, dots, etc.) these cash coins are fairly homogeneous in both type and module.

During the reign of Emperor Ling, a type of Wu Zhu cash coin known as "corner coins" (角錢) are believed to have been produced in the year 186 AD. Cities in ancient China had city walls built surrounding them as a means of fortification and protection. It is said that the square central hole of these "corner coins" represented the city and that the 4 lines going out of the coin symbolised wealth flowing out, portending the fall of the Eastern Han dynasty in the year 220 AD.

Wu Zhu cash coins would be cast for over 700 years, meaning that it is very difficult to attribute Wu Zhu cash coins to a specific reign or a specific period. So it's not always easy to attribute cash coins with this inscription without more context or more knowledge of series. The reason why the attribution of Wu Zhu cash coins produced after the fall of the Han dynasty is difficult is because at this time Chinese coins were cast using bronze moulds and, since these moulds would last a long time, they would continue to be used over and over again by subsequent dynasties.

== Silver coinages ==
During the Han dynasty period, sycees (silver ingots) were introduced as a currency, though they weren't as commonly used as bronze cash coins.

=== Bai Jin San Pin ===
The Bai Jin San Pin (白金三品, "White metal three kinds"), according to the Records of the Grand Historian, was introduced in 119 BC during the reign of Emperor Wu as both the Han–Xiongnu War and the territorial expansion of the Han Empire caused the imperial government to desperately increase their revenues. Among the reasons why the government started issuing this new type of currency was to remedy the inflation caused by the excessive issuance of bad money, but the Bai Jin San Pin would prove to be an insufficient solution. The Records of the Grand Historian claim that the new "white metal" (白金) money was a mixture of silver and tin. All of these weighed less than 120 g (4.2 oz).

Both the Records of the Grand Historian and the Book of Han mention that the agency responsible for the production of these coins was the Shaofu (少府). (Note: Various English translations of Shaofu (少府) exist, these include "Privy Treasurer", "Minister Steward", "Chamberlain of the Palace Revenues", and "Superintendent of the Lesser Treasury" (further reading: "Translation of Han dynasty titles"). The Shaofu was the government agency that oversaw the management of the palace treasury, i.e., the private finances of the Han dynasty'd imperial clan.)

The Bai Jin San Pin were issued in a total of 3 denominations, these different denominations differ from each other in both shape and surface pattern. Additionally, the Bai Jin San Pin are sometimes described by Chinese numismatists as "cake" coins or "biscuit" coins because, unlike the common cash coins that circulated at the time, they were not thin but rather unusually thick and heavy.

The back of the dragon coin is concave, with a circle of inscription symbols such as "V", "I", "M", and "N" around the periphery, the meaning of which is unknown, and a square "small" stamp is printed in the middle of the coin. The horse coin is very detailed and the back of the horse seems to have wings, which means a flying horse. The back of the horse coin is uneven with dents and no pattern, with a square "small" stamp.

The Bai Jin San Pin coins proved to be unsuccessful and were short-lived. The Chinese people considered them to be "empty coins" (虛幣) and their effect on the market was inflationary due to the fact that their nominal value was significantly higher than their intrinsic value. Furthermore, these coins were very easily counterfeited using less valuable metals like lead instead of silver. The high nominal values of the new silver currency would inspire many to counterfeit the coins. Hundreds of thousands were executed and eventually over a million people would be pardoned for counterfeiting after the government decided to reform the monetary system again. Government officials called for an improvement of the copper-alloy Wu Zhu to try to remedy the issues that the Bai Jin San Pin were created to solve.

After only circulating for 4 years the imperial government officially abolished their circulation in 115 BC.

List of Bai Jin San Pin silver coins:

Design	Nominal value	Shape	Description	Diameter	Thickness	Weight in taels (Weight in grams) (Note: The weights in taels were mentioned in the historical sources, weights in grams based on modern specimens.)	Image
Turtle (烏龜)	300 cash coins	Oval	The symbolism of domed shell of the turtle represents the round sky above and its flat bottom symbolises the flat earth below. Therefore, the image of the turtle represented the Han Chinese people who live beneath the vaulted sky and stand on the earth.	4 cm x 2 cm		4 tael (12 grams)	
Horse (馬)	500 cash coins	Square	The square shape is meant to represent the ancient Chinese concept of "earth". The horse is described as having its "head upright, chest high, with three legs on the ground and one hoof raised, full of vigor, and imposing momentum".	3.0 centimeters	0.2 centimeters	6 tael (18 grams)	
Dragon (龍)	3000 cash coins	Circle	The dragon Bai Jin San Pin was round in shape, which was meant to represent the Chinese concept of tian (the sky or heavens). The dragon's pattern design has been described as having a "long mouth, long neck, one horn, and flying through the clouds".	5.5 centimeters	0.4 centimeters	8 tael (146 grams)	

While the Bai Jin San Pin coins are generally recognised to be the "first official silver coins produced in China". The Bai Jin San Pin coins are neither pure silver nor are they shaped like traditional coins. Furthermore, a number of silver coins predating the Bai Jin San Pin coins are known to exist, this includes Warring States period silver spade money and silver Ban Liang cash coins attributed to the State of Qin. However, none of these older silver coins are mentioned in any extent official documents. It is therefore more accurate to describe the Bai Jin San Pin as the "first legal silver coins minted by the government for general circulation and recorded in official documents".

==== Lead Bai Jin San Pin coins ====
While the Records of the Grand Historian describes the Bai Jin San Pin coins as being made of a silver-tin alloy (described as a "white metal"), no specimens of these coins were known to exist until a number of turtle, horse, and dragons coins fitting the descriptions of these coins began to be excavated in the 1980s at various archaeological digs. However, these Bai Jin San Pin coins were all made of lead. The authenticity of these lead Bai Jin San Pin coins was called into question as these were never mentioned by any historical texts and no silver Bai Jin San Pin coins were found at that point. In 2003 an academic seminar was held in Hanzhong, Shaanxi where scholars would discuss the Bai Jin San Pin and what was known at the time about it to try to reach a consensus about it. The scholars generally agreed on the shape and size of the coins, and the scholars reached a consensus on the idea that the coins were cast during the reign of Emperor Wu. Consensus was also reached that the period from issuance to its abolition lasted about 6 six years and because of their high nominal values that only small quantities were produced.

Officially, the laws of the Han dynasty prohibited the government from issuing coinages made using base metals (including lead). These lead coins are likely either counterfeit money or burial money. Counterfeiting circulating currency was common throughout Chinese history and because the nominal value of the Bai Jin San Pin coins was so high it was both easy and highly profitable to make lead counterfeits. However, as only the emperor had the legal right to produce coins during this period and the Han dynasty government issued the capital punishment for counterfeiters, thousands were executed.

It wasn't until 2007 that the first silver horse Bai Jin San Pin coin was discovered in the Shaanxi province and until 2013 that the first silver turtle Bai Jin San Pin coin was found in Xi'an (which was known as Chang'an during the Han dynasty period). The discovery of these silver coins confirmed that these were indeed the authentic legal coins as described in the ancient texts and that the lead coins weren't.

As of December 2020 no authentic silver dragon Bai Jin San Pin coins are known to exist.

== Gold coinages ==
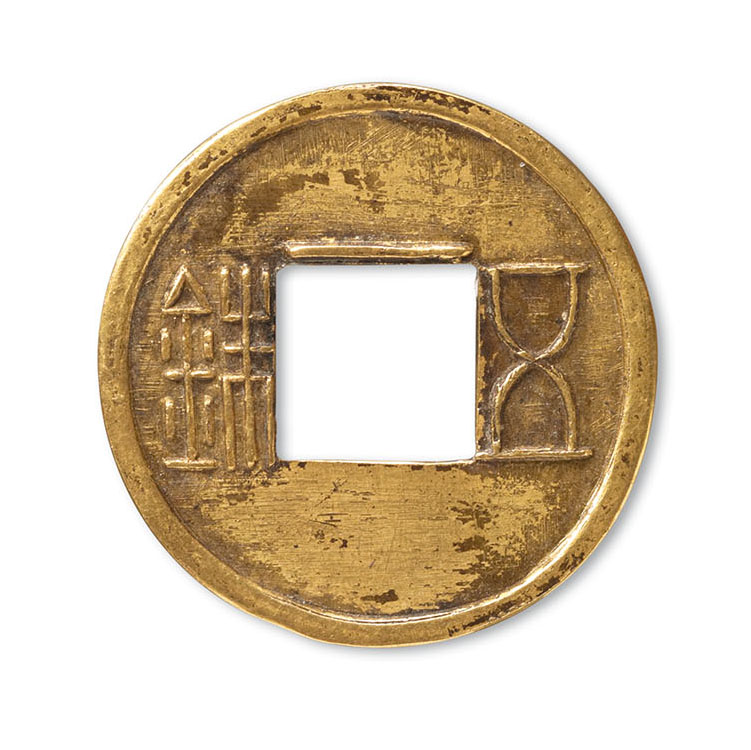
A golden Wu Zhu (五銖) cash coin produced during the Han dynasty period.

The chapter on the equalisation of agronomical matters (平準書) in the Records of the Grand Historian explains that after the Qin dynasty unified China that it introduced both copper-alloy cash coins and gold coins known as Yi (鎰). These gold coins, like the Ban Liang cash coins, had inscriptions that indicated their weight. During the Qin dynasty period other precious objects were also a means of payment, but they were not perceived as money.

While the Han dynasty didn't immediately reform the "low currency" (下幣 / 下币) copper-alloy Ban Liang cash coins used by the preceding Qin dynasty, it did reform the "high currency" (上幣 / 上币), namely gold. While during the Qin dynasty gold was denominated and weighed in taels (兩) it would now be denominated in catties (斤). During the Han dynasty period a single catty weighed about 250~300 grams. Prior to the Han dynasty period, jade had a long history of use in China, gold was in itself a 'new' element of Chinese culture as was gold coinage.

During the Han dynasty one catty of gold currency was valued at around ten thousand bronze Ban Liang cash coins.

== Lead coinages ==
In a 2005 article in the numismatic journal Xinjiang Numismatics (新疆钱币), it was reported that a number of lead cash coins dating to the Western Han dynasty period were uncovered in a small village in the Ningxia Hui Autonomous Region. This discovery was unprecedented as no historical records ever mentioned the production of lead coinages during the Han dynasty.

== List of Han dynasty cash coins ==
Type	Inscription (Traditional Chinese)	Catalogue numbers	Image
Ban Liang cash coins - Qin / Han type (220-180 BC). Weight about 5 grams, reverse plain and flat.
Normal ban.	Ban Liang (半兩)	Hartill #7.8, FD #415, Schjøth #88-91	
Ban inverted.	Ban Liang (半兩)	Hartill #7.9, FD #417	
Ban Liang cash coins - Western Han dynasty types
"Elm seed" cash coins (榆莢錢). Very small. (200-180 BC).	Ban Liang (半兩)	Hartill #7.10-7.13, FD #411-414, Schjøth #86-87	
Wu Fen Ban Liang cash coins (五分半兩錢), weight of 2.4 zhu. Small coins, large hole. (182-175 BC).
Normal inscription.	Ban Liang (半兩)	Hartill #7.14, FD #421	
Inscription repeated above and below.	Ban Liang Ban Liang (半兩半兩)	Hartill #7.15, FD #420	
Nominal weight of 4 zhu (actual weight of 3 grams or less). No rims. (175-119 BC).
Bottom of the Liang looks like M.	Ban Liang (半兩)	Hartill #7.16	
Bottom of the Liang looks like a sideways E.	Ban Liang (半兩)	Hartill #7.17, FD #422, Schjøth #92-95	
Inscription reversed.	Liang Ban (兩半)	Hartill #7.18, FD #425, Schjøth #96-99	
Two lines above the hole.	Ban Liang (半兩)	Hartill #7.19	
Vertical line above and below.	Ban Liang (半兩)	Hartill #7.20, FD #423	
Dot and crescent ("Sun and Moon") above and below.	Ban Liang (半兩)	Hartill #7.21, FD #424	
"Wu" (五) sideways below.	Ban Liang Wu (半兩五)	Hartill #7.22	
It is thought that the additional characters on Hartill #7.23-7.27 are personal names.
Zhu San (主三) sideways above and below.	Ban Liang Zhu San (半兩主三)	Hartill #7.23	
Bei? (貝?) sideways above and below.	Ban Liang Bei Bei (半兩貝貝)	Hartill #7.24	
Shang Wen (上問) above and below.	Ban Liang Shang Wen (半兩上問)	Hartill #7.25	
Tai Chang (太常) sideways above and below.	Ban Liang Tai Chang (半兩太常)	Hartill #7.26	
Hu Yu Gong (胡羽公) below.	Ban Liang Hu Yu Gong (半兩胡羽公)	Hartill #7.27	
Iron Ban Liang cash coins of the Western Han dynasty.
Iron cash coin. (Many of these have been found in the Hunan province.)	Ban Liang (半兩)	Hartill #7.28	
Nominal weight 4 zhu. Coins with rims. (136-119 BC).
Bottom of the Liang looks like a sideways E.	Ban Liang (半兩)	Hartill #7.29, FD #433, Schjøth #104 &c	
Two lines below.	Ban Liang (半兩)	Hartill #7.30, FD #434	
Inscription reversed.	Liang Ban (兩半)	Hartill #7.31, FD #435	
Bottom of the Liang character looks like M. Fine workmanship.	Ban Liang (半兩)	Hartill #7.32, FD #432	
San Zhu cash coins (三銖錢).
With outer rim.	San Zhu (三銖)	Hartill #8.1, FD #431, Schjøth #103	
No rim.	San Zhu (三銖)	Hartill #8.2	
Inscription reversed.	Zhu San (銖三)	Hartill #8.3	
Jun Guo Wu Zhu cash coins (君國五銖錢).
Jun Guo Wu Zhu.	Wu Zhu (五銖)	Hartill #8.4, FD #441, Schjøth #114	
Chi Ze Wu Zhu cash coins (赤仄五銖錢). (Note: Chi Ze (赤仄) means "Red (or Shining) Edge", referring to the red copper showing when the edges were filed smooth.)
Chi Ze Wu Zhu.	Wu Zhu (五銖)	Hartill #8.5	
Chi Ze Wu Zhu.	Wu Zhu (五銖)	Hartill #8.6	
Chi Ze Wu Zhu.	Wu Zhu (五銖)	Hartill #8.7	
Shang Lin San Guan Wu Zhu cash coins (上林三官五銖錢).
Shang Lin San Guan Wu Zhu.	Wu Zhu (五銖)	Hartill #8.8, Schjøth #115	
Other Western Han Wu Zhu cash coins.
No rim above the hole. c. 90 BC.	Wu Zhu (五銖)	Hartill #8.9	
Half-moon mark below the hole. Distinguish from Hartill #10.34, cf Hartill #9.49.	Wu Zhu (五銖)	Hartill #8.10	
Small "Wu" (五), typical of moulds dating from the reign of Emperor Xuan (73-49 BC).	Wu Zhu (五銖)	Hartill #8.11	
Dot above the hole. Also found on Eastern Han Wu Zhus. (See Hartill #10.32).	Wu Zhu (五銖)	Hartill #8.12	
Early Wu Zhu cash coins produced by the Eastern Han dynasty and rebellions.
Iron Wu Zhu. Resembles the W. Han coin. Two of which were considered to be equal to one copper-alloy cash coin. Cast by the rebel state of Chengjia.	Wu Zhu (五銖)	Hartill #10.1, FD #509	
Jian Wu Wu Zhu (建武五銖). Head of the 朱 component of the "Zhu" (銖) character is rounded, typical of the Eastern Han dynasty period.	Wu Zhu (五銖)	Hartill #10.2, FD #510, Schjøth #178	
Si Chu (Four Corner) Wu Zhu (四出五銖). Attributed to the Eastern Han period Emperor Ling, AD 186. The 4 lines are commonly said to represent wealth flowing from a ruined city, an omen of the overthrow of the Han dynasty.
Four lines on the reverse side.	Wu Zhu (五銖)	Hartill #10.3, FD #512, Schjøth #179	
Two dots in the "Wu" (五).	Wu Zhu (五銖)	Hartill #10.4	
Inscription reversed.	Zhu Wu (銖五)	Hartill #10.5, FD #513	
Two dots above and below hole on obverse.	Wu Zhu (五銖)	Hartill #10.6	
Four dots on the reverse.	Wu Zhu (五銖)	Hartill #10.7	

== Manufacturing processes ==
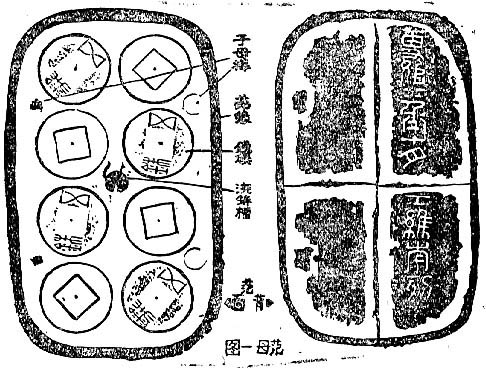
A Wu Zhu (五銖) bronze mother mould.

=== "Upright casting" with piece moulds ===
The initial method of producing cash coins during the Han dynasty period was known as "Upright Casting" with piece moulds (板范豎式澆鑄). This was the first form of metal casting known in China and dates back as far as the Shang dynasty and Western Zhou dynasty periods, this manufacturing technique would be used continually from the middle and later parts of the Spring and Autumn period of the Zhou period until as late as the Western Han dynasty. From the beginning coin casting was done at generalised bronze casting workshops that specialised in bronze objects and like the casting moulds of the aes the moulds used for early Chinese coinages were made of clay.

Different manufacturing techniques had different advantages and disadvantages, the formed and baked clay moulds that were commonplace before this era saw rising competition from stone moulds, this was because the carved moulds that were utilised were made of soft stones and they were easily made and their creation was at a lower cost because they could be utilised in coin production more than once, as opposed to stone moulds. While they were better to use than clay moulds, stone moulds had the tendency to become brittle with ease during the casting process, so manufacturers would soon introduce bronze casting moulds. This evolution was paired with larger interiors for the moulds so that they were capable of producing even more cash coins during a single casting session, during the early Western Han period these larger bronze moulds could produce as much as several dozens of cash coins at a time and unlike the earlier moulds they could be used much more often. The casting process in these early moulds worked in a way that two mould-sections were placed together, then the core of the mould was placed into the top area, then the bronze smiths would pour molten metal into an opening that was formed by a cavity that was located in its centre.

=== "Stack casting" ===
"Stack casting" (疊鑄) is a method of cash coin casting where large quantities of identical coin moulds were placed together in a way that they were all connected to a single common casting gate, this allowed for a very large quantity of objects to be manufactured in only a single casting session, saving time, labour power, metal, materials for fuel, and refractory material.

Historians still debate when the "stack casting" method was first used, some believe that it originated during the Warring States period while others than it started sometime during the Western Han dynasty period by commoners. While some Ban Liang cash coins of the early Western Han dynasty period and the 4 zhu Ban Liang cash coins were produced using this method. It wasn't until it was adopted by the imperial Chinese government during the Xin dynasty period, under the rule of Emperor Wang Mang, that this technique would become the most common method for the production of cash coins. The adoption of this casting method allowed for the government to produce more cash coins, as during the Xin dynasty a single cast could produce 184 cash coins, a number which wasn't possible to have been achieved with the earlier "Upright Casting" technique of manufacturing cash coins. A 2004 simulation experiment managed to cast 480 coins during a single casting process with this technique. From the Eastern Han dynasty period until the adoption of sand-mould casting this would be the main technique for casting bronze cash coins in China.

The "stack casting" method would continue to be improved over the ages and was used in China until the end of the Southern dynasties during the Northern and Southern dynasties period.

In China the "stack casting" method would be superseded by the sand casting method for producing cash coins sometime during the 5th and 6th centuries, but the "stack casting" method endured in Vietnam until as late as the 19th century, as the French colonial authorities reported on the Nguyễn dynasty still using the "stack casting" method for producing cash coins until modern machine-struck cash coins were introduced.

== Mintage numbers ==
From 118 BC to 5 AD, the government minted over 28,000,000,000 cash coins, with an annual average of 220,000,000 coins minted (or 220,000 strings of 1,000 cash coins). In comparison, the Tianbao period (天寶) (742–755 AD) of the Tang dynasty produced 327,000,000 coins every year while 3,000,000,000 cash coins in 1045 AD and 5,860,000,000 cash coins in 1080 AD were made in the Song dynasty (960–1279 AD).

== Han dynasty coin charms ==
=== The emergence of Chinese numismatic charms ===
As China was one of the first countries in the world to use metal coinage and its ancient history and this usage can be traced back well over two thousand years it is also the ancient history of exonumismatics, the evolution of ancient Chinese coinage has gone side-by-side with the evolution of "coin-like" charms, amulets, and talismans. Cast throughout the centuries, these are referred to in English as "Chinese numismatic charms". Informally the Chinese referred to them as "yansheng coins" (traditional Chinese: 厭勝錢; simplified Chinese: 厌胜钱; pinyin: yàn shèng qián), "ya sheng coins" (traditional Chinese: 壓勝錢; simplified Chinese: 压胜钱; pinyin: yā shèng qián), "flower coins" (traditional Chinese: 花錢; simplified Chinese: 花钱; pinyin: huā qián), or "play coins" (traditional Chinese: 玩錢; simplified Chinese: 玩钱; pinyin: wán qián). The term "Yansheng" means "to curse" (厭) on the evil spirits so as "to crush" (勝) them, and later these numismatic charms started to bear the meaning of inviting good fortune and warding off evil spirits. Today, Chinese numismatic charms are often referred to as "flower coins" (花錢). Chinese coin-like charms, are generally agreed to date back to the second century CE and continued to be used until middle of the 20th century.

While the making of numismatic charms first appeared during the Western Han dynasty period, they flourished, both in terms of quantity and quality, during the Ming and Qing dynasties.

Symbols began to appear on certain Chinese coins starting about 2,000 years ago. Initially, these symbols were very simple such as raised "dots" (representing stars) and raised crescent-shaped lines (representing the moon) before evolving into more complicated symbols and eventually into the complex Chinese numismatic charms of later dynasties.

These numismatic charms did not serve as any form of official coinage but merely took the form of money, as the concept of money represents power. Coin-shaped charms are, therefore in the mind of the ancient Chinese, a very compact form of power and were used to suppress evil spirits, bring "good luck", "good fortune", and to avert possible misfortune. These coin-like amulets were then filled with various types of symbolism and are believed by the multitude of Chinese to have vast powers.

While many of the very earliest forms of monetary instruments found in Chinese history had inscriptions (legends) which identified their place (state or kingdom) of production, some also included their denominations. Gradually, other notations began to appear on Chinese coins, these symbols included dots (星), crescents (仰月), circles, lines and blobs. These various types of simple marks and symbols can be found to be made "in relief" into the coin, which is commonly known as yangwen (traditional Chinese: 陽文; simplified Chinese: 阳文; pinyin: Yáng wén), where they protrude above the surface of the coin, or they may be carved, engraved or incused into the coin, which is commonly known as yinwen (traditional Chinese: 陰文; simplified Chinese: 阴文; pinyin: Yīn wén). While these early simple symbols that appeared on ancient Chinese coinage are not well understood by numismatists today, they are believed to represent stars, moons, suns, numbers, etc. (see below).

The Han dynasty period is notable in the history of Chinese numismatic charms as it is the definite period in which the first widely accepted true charms were produced. Though it is not exactly known when "good luck" charms first appeared in China, the precursors to Chinese numismatic charms can be traced back to at least the 7th to 4th century BC. For example, there is a Qi Kingdom "three character knife" (a type of knife money) with the character ji (吉) meaning "auspicious", it is generally believed that this character derived from a character on ancient oracle bone script character meaning "to pray for luck". Near the end of the Warring States period a "一刀" round coin also had this same character. Many scholars of numismatics and exonumismatics now believe that the first true charms and amulets in Chinese history actually appeared during the Han dynasty period, this claim is further strengthened by archaeological evidence. Some of these early Chinese numismatic charms that were discovered were meant to be worn (see "Chinese pendant charms").

The reasons for the emergence of Chinese numismatic charms are complex and is likely due to the private production of money and monetary products during this period. Typically throughout history central governments usually attempt to monopolise the production of money in order to minimise financial chaos. In so doing, the private production and minting is usually prohibited. Following the unification of China under Qin Shi Huang he abolished all existing forms of money that circulated in China at the time (spade money, knife money, round coins, Etc.) and established and made the Ban Liang cash coins the sole legal currency of China. Despite the fact that Ban Liang cash coins had an officially stipulated standard size and weight, the large number of pieces that have survived from that era show that there was a wide variation in their actual sizes and weights. This indicates that, despite the creation of a unified monetary system throughout the Chinese Empire, the actual casting coins in the country remained decentralised.

During the Qin dynasty period some Ban Liang cash coins had raised dots on their surface which possibly were meant to represent stars. During the Western Han dynasty period Ban Liang cash coins with horizontal and vertical lines as well as with raised dots began to be seen, these could possibly be explained as representing the stars, moon, and sun. Many of the later made Wu Zhu cash coins also "auspicious symbols" including stars and star constellations, the moon, the sun, clouds, swords, swastikas both above and below the square hole, dragons, auspicious animals such as the turtle and snake, etc. It is thought by scholars that these symbols relate to a number of fundamental beliefs held by the ancient Chinese people relating to various concepts such as yin and yang and the Wuxing.

It is unknown when "dots" began to appear, but it was during the Western Han dynasty that they became more frequently seen on Ban Liang cash coins produced during this era, these "dots" are among the first and most common symbols to appear on early Chinese coinage. These "dots" are typically very small and are raised above at the same level as any Chinese seal script character found on the obverse of the cash coin as well as the rims surrounding the edge of the cash coin or its square central hole. This is an indication that these symbols were indeed intentionally carved into the mould that was used to produce the coinage. However, in some cases, these "dots" are located below the surface of the cash coin indicating they had to have been engraved or incused later on the cash coin following their mintage and not during. These "dots" can be located on both the obverse and reverse sides of these early cash coins and their quantity can range from one to multiple.

This very simple symbol would mark the initial step in a development that would later evolve into the much more sophisticated symbolism that would later be found on the charms and amulets produced during the reigns of later Chinese dynasties.

During the reign of the Han dynasty Empress Lü Zhi an edict was issued prohibiting private citizens from producing money, meaning that that counterfeiting had run rampant. During the reign of Emperor Wen this prohibition on the private production of currency was abolished. One of the personally favourite officials of Emperor Wen, Senior Grand Master Deng Tong (鄧通), issued currency that is said to have "prevailed throughout the realm". Deng Tong was allowed to produce cash coins for a total of 3 years and to bring "more happiness" (多福) to the people he added an extra bit of metal both above and below the square central hole to differentiate his privately cast 4 zhu Ban Liang cash coins from other 4 zhu Ban Liang cash coins.

Although later in subsequent dynasties in Chinese history they would again attempt to prohibit non-state coinage production the private market would continue to produce cash coins to offset demand. While the primary purpose of this production was to be profitable, a good part of the casting was because the ancient Chinese people believed that coin-like charms can avert misfortune, to celebrate happy events, and to control evil. As various symbols on cash coins such as "numbers", dots, crescents, circles, Chinese characters, and other symbols were cast beginning in the Eastern Han Dynasty and continued until manufacturing of cash coins with the Wu Zhu inscription finally ceased with the introduction of the Kaiyuan Tongbao series of cash coins near the end of the 6th century, it is speculated that these early precursors to Chinese numismatic charms were produced locally or privately cast. This is because the Eastern Han dynasty period until the early Tang dynasty period was filled with tremendous eras of unrest and widespread economic insecurities throughout China causing for the private and local production of cash coins to become widespread during this era.

=== Dots, crescents, circles, numbers, counting rods, Chinese characters, and other symbols appearing on coins ===
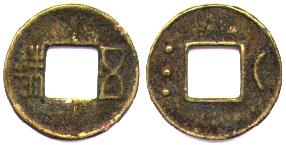
A Wu Zhu (五銖) cash coin charm with 3 "dots" and a crescent.

During the middle period of the Eastern Han dynasty, marked the beginning of the appearance of marks, such as bars (thick stripes), above or below the hole, dots, lines above or below the characters. In this period, the coins keep a quality similar to that of the cash coins of the Western Han dynasty period. According to French numismatist François Thierry de Crussol the meaning of the marks is, as with those of the Western Han dynasty period, an enigma that has yet to be definitively solved.

Following "dots", another common symbol found on early ancient Chinese coins from this period is the crescent, which was first introduced on Ban Liang cash coins during the Western Han dynasty. Crescents sometimes resemble the mark that a human fingernail would make if pressed on a soft surface. These crescents are found both on the obverse and reverse sides of cash coins. The moon or crescent marks are variously referred to by the Chinese under a number of names, namely "moon lines" (traditional Chinese: 月紋; simplified Chinese: 月纹; pinyin: Yuè wén), "nail lines" (traditional Chinese: 甲紋; simplified Chinese: 甲纹; pinyin: Jiǎ wén), or "moon marks" (Chinese: 月痕; pinyin: Yuè hén). While the most common appearance of crescents on cash coins show only a single crescent, cash coins with two, three, or as much as four crescents are also known to exist.

Another symbol in the form small circles, which are believed to represent the "sun", are occasionally seen on early Chinese cash coins. During the Eastern Han dynasty these circles were commonly found on Wu Zhu cash coins.

During the middle of the Eastern Han dynasty period ranging from the reigns of Emperor Ming to Emperor Huan these marks became much more common than they previously were. During the Eastern Han dynasty period vertical, slanted, and horizontal lines, sometimes only a single line and sometimes using multiple lines, frequently began to appear on Wu Zhu cash coins. These lines are generally believed by numismatists to represent Chinese numerals, examples include "一" (one), "二" (two), and "三" (three). Larger numbers are usually written in their respective Chinese seal script character as opposed to lines, examples include "six" (六), "nine" (九), "ten" (十), etc. While the original reason for these lines remains unknown, they do not appear to be indication any denominational "value" or "worth" of these cash coins, meaning that a Chinese character indicating "six" (六) does not correspond with a token value of 6 standard cash coins. Instead, numismatists speculate that these "numbers" were used to indicate some sort of "quantity" or "measure" although it remains unclear in what capacity they were used as such and how they were meant to be interpreted.

In the Shu Han Kingdom, Wu Zhu cash coins with 3 vertical lines, particularly incused lines, are often interpreted as meaning the word "river", based on the Chinese character "川".

Other than regular Chinese numbers, Chinese rod numerals are also found on some ancient cash coins, the Chinese rod system was based on short sticks (called "counting rods") and their various configurations represented "rod numbers" or "rod numerals". These "counting rods", speculatively, could be placed in various positions to indicate numbers within a box specifically made for this purpose. By placing these "counting rods" in different positions and orientations, enabling addition and subtraction and other mathematical calculations to be utilised as would later be possible with the (much) later invented abacus. During the Xin dynasty the "Value 10" spade coin used rod numbers to indicate it's denomination setting up precedence for rod numbers to appear on the Wu Zhu cash coins of the Eastern Han dynasty and later periods.

Various Chinese seal script characters also appeared on early Chinese coinages which would later influence Chinese numismatic charms. Amongst the most common characters are "small" (小), "level" such as a "plain" (平), "work" or "industry" (工), "field" (田), and "King" (王). The reason for these Chinese characters remain unknown, Gary Ashkenazy from the Primaltrek website notes that they "were probably used to indicate the scope or limits in which the coins were intended to circulate" indicating that they might have been included to indicate that these cash coins were only meant to circulate in areas that were designated by the placement of these characters. As the character "王" might indicate the surname "Wang" and "田" the surname "Tian", it is possible that some of these characters might have indicated that these cash coins were possibly possessed or manufactured by a specific individual or family.

Other "auspicious symbols", such as the swastika, are also commonly found on some Wu Zhu cash coins.

=== "Yin Yang" and the "Five Elements" as the basis for Star, Moon, Cloud, and Dragon symbols on ancient Chinese coins and charms ===
On early cash coins the "dots" are typically referred to as "stars" and the crescents as "moons", respectively by the Chinese. As time went by the complexity of these symbols began to increase and irregular round-shaped forms, known as "clouds" (雲 / 云) or "auspicious clouds" (祥雲 / 祥云) began to appear. Finally, another symbol referred to by Chinese numismatists known as "dragons" (龍 / 龙) appeared.

As there are no clear indications when or why these symbols began to appear on ancient Chinese coins a number hypotheses have been put forward. The most popular hypothesis regarding the appearance of crescents, or "moons", is that they were in fact "marks of celebrities", namely that a famous person (for example, an empress-consort) would impress their fingernail into a clay coin mould before it had hardened after drying up, not unlike American celebrities (namely actors and actresses) impressing their hands into the Hollywood Walk of Fame in front of Grauman's Chinese Theatre today. Meanwhile for the "dots", also known as "stars", the leading hypothesis is that the traditional Chinese character character for "star" (星) not only referred to the celestial bodies but also "to spread" or "to disseminate", through the antiquated definition of bù (布), or alternatively sàn (散) meaning "to distribute" or "to give out". These alternative readings then meant that the presence of "stars" on cash coins had a meaning that cash coins, like the star-studded sky, widespread, and numerous, should likewise be distributed throughout the Chinese Empire (or "the world").

An alternative hypothesis for the appearance of "dots" (or "stars"), crescents (or "moons"), "auspicious clouds", and "dragons" on cash coins is that they relate to the philosophy and religious beliefs present in ancient China during the Zhou, Qin, and Han dynasty periods. Namely, the ancient Chinese belief in yin and yang and the Wuxing, which in ancient Chinese thought was used to explain both the structure of the earth and the universe in which the planet existed.

The ancient Chinese word for "coin" (泉) was identical to the ancient Chinese word for "spring" (泉), meaning that cash coins were associated with the element of "water". The ancient Chinese believed that water was the accumulated cold air (vapours) of yin (陰 / 阴) energy originating on the moon (月). Therefore, the extended meaning of a "moon" (represented as "dots") and the "(auspicious) clouds" on ancient Chinese coinages was that the currency should circulate just like the flowing, gushing, and rising waters of the world.

Regarding the presence of "clouds" on ancient Chinese cash coins and charms, their association comes from "rain water" (雨) as the second Trigram (坎) of the Eight Trigrams (八卦) is mentioned in the I Ching as water existing in the heavens (tian) in the form clouds. This would add the hidden meaning that cash coins displaying images of "auspicious clouds" should also circulate as free as the flow of water.

Like the "moon" and the "auspicious clouds", the wiggly-line symbol known as the "dragon" is also associated with the Wuxing element of "water", as the ancient Chinese associated the dragon with this element. The Chinese dragon is considered to be a "water animal" that sends the rain. While later in Chinese history the dragon would become the supreme symbol of the Emperor of China, during the Han dynasty the Dragon, as a spirit, was believed to be associated with water as it would exhale the wind and then summon the rain. This means that "dragons", like "moons" and "auspicious clouds" indicated that cash coins are meant to circulate freely like both the stars in the sky and the flow of water.

=== The appearance of the first "true charms" ===
During the Han dynasty, the first Chinese charms which are generally considered to be "true charms" were created. Among the Han dynasty coin charms are those with Liubo patterns, liubo is possibly the earliest known board game in Chinese history with a complete set of rules and props. Besides coin charms, liubo patterns were also found on stones and baked bricks, funerary models, and bronze mirrors. Many scholars note that a Chinese pendant charm with the two inscriptions rì rù qiān jīn (日入千金, "may you earn a 1,000 gold everyday") and Zhǎng wú xiāng wàng (長毋相忘 / 长毋相忘, "do not forget your friends") is among the first "true charms" produced during this period. The meaning of these 2 inscriptions placed together means "do not forget your friends when you earn much gold everyday", indicating that it's a reminder for people to not forget those who were there for them before they became rich.

This charm has large "dots" (representing "stars") located between the characters of its inscription not unlike the precursors to Chinese numismatic charms discussed above.

This pendant charm has a large loop at one end of the charm and contains a minor tab with a round hole at the other, while in the middle there is a disc resembling a cash coin with the aforementioned inscriptions read clockwise on it. While it is uncertain how it was used, it is possible that it was either hung from the waist, used as a button or fastener on a garment, or placed as a part of a necklace. While the original version of these charms date to the Han dynasty, many later made versions are known to exist.

Another version of this Han dynasty period charm has the same design but features different obverse and reverse inscriptions, the alternative version has the inscription chú xiōng qù yāng (除兇去央 / 除凶去央, "do away with evil and dispel calamity") on one side and pì bīng mò dāng (闢兵莫當 / 辟兵莫当, "avoid hostilities and ward off sickness") on the other. Indicating that this was a protective charm intended to ward off evil spirits and other negative events. A version of this amulet exists but with no loops.

During the Han dynasty a type of cast amulet known as Coiled Dragon and Stars (龍扭星) appeared, these are also referred to as Graters and Curry Combs, and are mentioned by Lu Zhenhai (卢振海) in his 1991 work Chinese Old Talismanic Coin Register (中国古代压胜钱谱, Zhōngguó gǔdài yā shèng qián pǔ). However, the authenticity of the Han period Coiled Dragon and Stars amulets cannot be established as only rubbings and drawings are mentioned.

== Hoards of Han dynasty coins ==
- Between the years 1955 and 1959 a number of iron Ban Liang cash coins were unearthed in Western Han dynasty era tombs in the Hunanese cities of Hengyang and Changsha. These hoards point out to the possibility that China has used iron cash coins over a millennium before the Northern Song dynasty, as was traditionally thought before these discoveries.
- In 1980, a golden Wu Zhu cash coin was unearthed in the prefecture-level city of Xianyang in province of Shaanxi. This golden cash coin is 2.6 cm in diameter and was cast during the Western Han dynasty period.
- In the year 2000 at the archeological site of So Kwun Wat, Tuen Mun in the special administrative region of Hong Kong over sixty Han dynasty era bronze cash coins were unearthed which included both Ban Liang (半兩) and Wu Zhu (五銖) cash coins, among the hoard were also pieces of linen and bamboo mats.
- In February 2003 a coin hoard consisting of several hundreds of Wu Zhu cash coins held in a string by rope.
- In January 2006 during the construction of a plaza in Pingli County, Shaanxi a Han dynasty era tomb was uncovered, during its excavation archeologists found 259 Wu Zhu cash coins, 1 tripod made from iron, a pottery kitchen range as well as 3 pottery urns.
- On June 15, 2011, it was reported that the Guangzhou Cultural Relics Archaeological Research Institute had unearthed a pile of one thousand cash coins while excavating an Eastern Han dynasty period grave in Guangzhou, Guangdong. The discovered cash coins are all Xin dynasty period cash coins with the inscription Daquan Wushi (大泉五十). The Eastern Han dynasty grave is 8.2 meters in length and 5.02 meters in width. Other than the cash coins, the archeologists had also discovered nearly a hundred other objects inside of the grave including a bronze mirror, pottery, coloured tile, as well as different types of ornaments and jewelry made of jade and agate.
- On July 16, 2012, a large cache of 14,000 ancient Chinese coins was found in Kuqa, Xinjiang which included Han dynasty era Wu Zhu (五銖) and "Chiseled rim Wu Zhu" (鑿邊五銖) cash coins, Xin dynasty era Huo Quan (貨泉) and Daquan Wushi (大泉五十) cash coins, a Three Kingdoms period Taiping Baiqian (太平百錢) cash coins, as well as native cash coins. Alongside the cash coins were shards of pottery as well as fragments of human bones which lead the archeologists believe that this was an old cemetery.
- In August 2012 a large hoard of Wu Zhu cash coins and Xin dynasty era cash coins was found in the city of Huoluochaideng, Ordos City Inner Mongolia. The hoard included 3500 kg of Chinese cash coins and around 150 clay moulds used to manufacture coins from the Xin dynasty. According to archeologists the site might've been a mint that was in operation since the reign of Emperor Wu until Emperor Wang Mang.
- During excavations conducted from November to December in 2012 in the Yujiabu cemetery in Zhangqiu, Jinan Shandong, the Jinan Municipal Archaeological Institute had discovered a number of cash coins in the tombs. The excavation had discovered a total of seventeen tombs, including earth shaft tombs from the Han dynasty period, earth shaft tombs with a brick-built outer coffin from the Han dynasty period, brick-chamber tombs from the Han dynasty period, and an earth pit tomb with cave chamber from the Qing dynasty period. The 6 earth shafts mostly yielded Wu Zhu cash coins, while the tombs identified as "Tomb M3" and "Tomb M8" contained Xin dynasty period Daquan Wushi (大泉五十) cash coins, indicating that the people buried there were likely done so during the Xin dynasty period rather than the Han dynasty era.
- In 2015 Chinese archeologists uncovered 10 tonnes of bronze Wu Zhu cash coins from the Western Han dynasty (or around 2 million cash coins) alongside over ten thousand of other iron, bronze, and gold items in the Haihunhou cemetery near Nanchang, Jiangxi, among the other uncovered items were bamboo slips, wood tablets, as well as jade objects. As these Wu Zhu cash coins were strung in strings of 1000 pieces this proved that the practice of stringing cash coins per 1000 didn't first happen during the Tang dynasty as was previously thought but actually six hundred years earlier. By 2017 the cash coins unearthed at the site had numbered to around 2,000,000 Wu Zhu cash coins, on January 9, 2017, iFeng.com reported that a rare Wu Zhu cash coin with a character that was found to have been carved upside down.
- It was reported on November 17, 2015, by the Xinhua News Agency that at the tomb of the Marquis of Haihun in Xinjian, Jiangxi a number of gold coins had been found. Excavations of the tomb have been conducted since 2011. The gold objects unearthed included some 25 gold hoofs (a type of sycee) with varying weights from 40 to 250 grams and 50 very large gold coins weighing about 250 grams each. The gold coinages were packed inside of three different boxes that were placed under a bed that was located inside of the main chamber of the tomb. According to Yang Jie, who leads the excavation team, the gold objects were likely awarded to the Marquis of Haihun by the emperor himself.
- On Monday November 13, 2017, the Henan Cultural Relics Department announced that an excavation near Zhoukou, Henan had unearthed a large number of tombs and cash coins that date to the Han dynasty period. Over 120 different tombs were discovered, of which 105 dated to the Han dynasty period and 15 to the Song dynasty and Qing dynasty periods. Most of the cash coins unearthed at the site were Wu Zhu (五銖) cash coins, while also a number of Xin dynasty spade coins issued under Wang Mang, and Song Dynasty cash coins were also found in a number of tombs.
- In May of the year 2020 the Chengdu Institute of Cultural Relics and Archaeology reported on the findings in various tombs located in Chengdu, Sichuan which range from the Warring States period, the Qin dynasty, the Han dynasty, the Five Dynasties and Ten Kingdoms period, the Ming dynasty, and the Manchu Qing dynasty. Among these finds hundreds of cash coins dating to the late Han dynasty period were discovered. Various other items were also discovered inside of these burial sites.

== Numismatics and studies into the coinage ==
=== Metal content and alloys ===
According to a November 2011 article in the Microchemical Journal entitled Corrosion behavior and morphological features of archeological bronze coins from ancient China, the chemical composition of the Wu Zhu cash coins of the Han dynasty from the Zhongguan minting site hoard have been systematically investigated by the means of optical microscopy (OM), X-ray diffraction (X-RD), and scanning electron microscopy (SEM) equipped with backscattered electron (BSE) detector, and energy dispersive spectrometry (EDS) techniques. These investigations researched the nature of the patina and corrosion features on the surfaces of the coins. Analysis revealed that the presence of a type of corrosion found on the patina of the cash coins known as "bronze disease" is caused by chloride anions from cuprous chloride. The elemental compositions of the alloys of the Wu Zhu cash coins attributed to the Western Han dynasty period from this hoard on average was found to be 84.8–85.4 wt.% copper (Cu), 3.3–6.1 wt.% tin (Sn), 4.7–6.4 wt.% lead (Pb), and 2.6–2.9 wt.% antimony (Sb).

In the 2021 article Chemical studies of Chinese coinage II: from Qin to Yuan (221 BCE–1368 CE) by A. M. Pollard and Ruiliang Liu published in the journal Heritage Science the researchers noted the median levels of iron found in the alloys of cash coins jumped from the Qin dynasty period to the Western Han dynasty period, Pollard and Liu hypothesised that this might have been a reflection of the slagging processes in the production of the copper. The pre-Qin and Qin dynasty coinages have a median percentage of iron below 0.25%, whereas the median level of iron present in cash coins during the Western Han period rises to 0.74%. During the Western Han period the metallic compositions of coins varied widely. For orientation, a composition of Pb/Cu (lead/copper) = 0.1 and Sn/Cu (tin/copper) = 0.05 corresponds to approximately 87% copper, 4% tin, and 9% lead.

During the Xin dynasty period under Wang Mang there is a considerable reduction in the range of alloy compositions when compared to the previous Western Han period. Under Wang Mang, the relative alloy compositions are much more consistent. Pb/Cu (lead/copper) is mostly confined to between 0 and 0.3, and Sn/Cu (tin/copper) is likewise reduced to between 0.02 and 0.15. Pollard and Liu speculate that the reduction in compositional variation is probably a consequence of the currency reforms enacted under the reign of Wang Mang. When the Han dynasty is restored (Eastern Han dynasty period) this lower variation appears to have been largely preserved. After the fall of the Eastern Han dynasty there appears to be further gradual change, with the lead-copper ratio now being largely constrained to below 0.6, while the tin-copper ratio extending up to as much as 0.3, compared to being largely below 0.15 as it was during the Han dynasties, indicating that the tin content tends to be higher in the post-Han periods of Chinese history.

=== Studies into Han dynasty numismatic charms ===
The study ot Chinese coin-like charms and amulets dating the Han dynasty period has helped our modern understanding of the ancient Chinese board game of liubo.

== See also ==
- List of historical currencies

== Notes ==
=== Catalogue numbers ===
- Hartill = Cast Chinese Coins by David Hartill. Trafford, United Kingdom: Trafford Publishing. September 22, 2005. ISBN 978-1412054669.
- FD = Fisher's Ding (丁), George A. Fisher's copy of Ding Fubao's (丁福保) original work catalogue, 1980, 251 pages.
- Schjøth = "Chinese Currency, Currency of the Far East - A Comprehensive Text Chou Dynasty, 1122 B.C.–255 B.C. Through Ch'ing Dynasty 1644 A.D.–1911 A.D." by Fredrik Schjøth and Virgil Hancock, Oslow, Norway, 1929.
- Hartill-Qing = Qing Cash (清代貨幣) by David Hartill, Royal Numismatic Society (2003).
- Krause = C.L. Krause and C. Mishler, Standard Catalog of World Coins, Krause Publications, 1979.

== Sources ==
- Bielenstein, Hans (1980), The Bureaucracy of Han Times, Cambridge: Cambridge University Press, ISBN 978-0-521-22510-6.
- Bielenstein, Hans (1986), "Wang Mang, the Restoration of the Han Dynasty, and Later Han", in Twitchett, Denis; Loewe, Michael (eds.), The Cambridge History of China: Volume I: the Ch'in and Han Empires, 221 B.C. – A.D. 220, Cambridge: Cambridge University Press, pp. 223–290, ISBN 978-0-521-24327-8.
- Ebrey, Patricia (1986), "The Economic and Social History of Later Han", in Twitchett, Denis; Loewe, Michael (eds.), Cambridge History of China: Volume I: the Ch'in and Han Empires, 221 B.C. – A.D. 220, Cambridge: Cambridge University Press, pp. 608–648, ISBN 978-0-521-24327-8.
- Hartill, David (2005). Cast Chinese Coins. Trafford, UK.
- Hartill, David (2020). Cast Chinese Amulets.
- Hinsch, Bret (2002), Women in Imperial China, Lanham: Rowman & Littlefield Publishers, ISBN 978-0-7425-1872-8.
- Nishijima, Sadao (1986), "The Economic and Social History of Former Han", in Twitchett, Denis; Loewe, Michael (eds.), Cambridge History of China: Volume I: the Ch'in and Han Empires, 221 B.C. – A.D. 220, Cambridge: Cambridge University Press, pp. 545–607, ISBN 978-0-521-24327-8.
- Maddison, Angus (2001), The World Economy: A Millennial Perspective, OECD Publishing, ISBN 978-92-64-18608-8.
- Maddison, Angus (2007), Chinese economic performance in the long run, Organisation for Economic Co-operation and Development. Development Centre, ISBN 978-92-64-03762-5
