= Qianqian =

Type of lead coin used in China, Japan, and Vietnam

Lead cash coins
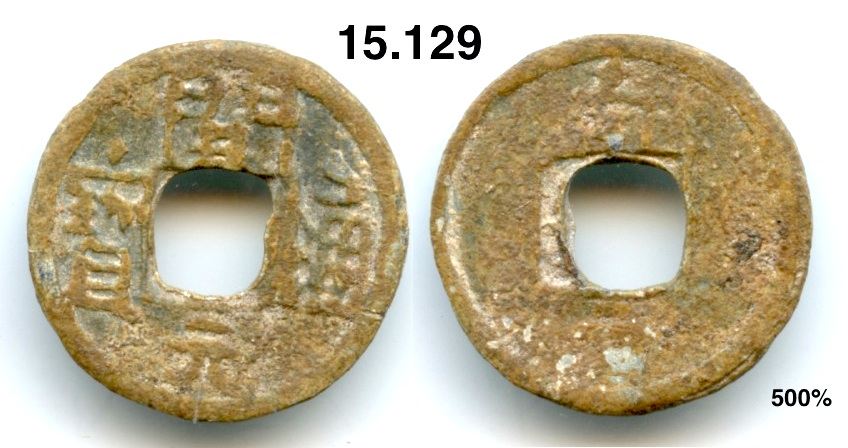
- A crude lead Kaiyuan Tongbao (開元通寳) cash coin produced during the Five Dynasties and Ten Kingdoms period, attributed either to the Southern Han or the Southern Chu Kingdom.

Chinese name
- Traditional Chinese: 鉛錢
- Simplified Chinese: 铅钱
Transcriptions
Standard Mandarin
- Hanyu Pinyin: qiān qián

Vietnamese name
- Vietnamese alphabet: Duyên tiền
- Chữ Hán: 鉛錢

Japanese name
- Kana: なまりせん
- Kyūjitai: 鉛錢
- Shinjitai: 鉛銭
Transcriptions
- Romanization: Namarisen

Lead cash coins (traditional Chinese: 鉛錢; simplified Chinese: 铅钱; pinyin: qiān qián; Vietnamese: Duyên tiền; (Note: Vernacular Vietnamese: Tiền đúc bằng chì.) Japanese: 鉛銭 (なまりせん); Rōmaji: Namarisen) are a type of Chinese, Japanese, and Vietnamese cash coin that were produced at various times during the monetary history of imperial China, Japan, and Vietnam. Typically cash coins produced in China between 300 BC and 1505 AD were made of bronze and those produced after 1505 AD were made of brass. But, like with iron cash coins, at times when copper was scarce government authorities would produce lead cash coins to supplement the money supply and maintain market liquidity.

The production of lead cash coins predominantly happened in regions where large quantities of lead were mined, namely southern China and the Tōhoku region in northern Honshu.

China is the first country in the world to issue lead coins, though when the first lead coins were produced remains controversial as it is commonly believed that the first lead coins in the world were the small Kaiyuan Tongbao (開元通寳) cash coins produced during the reign of King Wang Shenzhi of the Min Kingdom (Fujian) in 916. However, some claim that the production of lead coins was actually started a millennium earlier during the Zhou dynasty period. It is therefore taken that 916 is the earliest use of lead for the regular production of cash coins, while the lead Yi Hua (一化) coins from the State of Yan, ant-nose money from the State of Chu, and Ban Liang (半兩) cash coins dating from the Qin to the Western Han dynasties are in fact irregular uses.

Lead cash coins were also produced in what is today Indonesia by groups of Overseas Chinese living in the archipelago. The production of lead cash coins in Indonesia happened alongside tin and copper-alloy cash coins.

== Overview ==
Iron cash coins and lead cash coins were often used in cases when there was an insufficient supply of copper. Because of how soft lead is, most lead cash coins that are found today tend to be very worn.

Lead cash coins have only been produced at a few times in the monetary history of china, mainly during the Five dynasties and Ten kingdoms period. In some cases the usage of certain types of materials to produce cash coins are only more recently discovered due to the lack of historical records mentioning them. In some cases modern economic historians mention that they existed but don't go into much detail about them, for example Peng Xinwei mentions that lead and iron cash coins but doesn't mention much about them, only writing that the King of Chu was advised to use iron and lead because it was available in large amounts. It has only been since more recent times that the fact that the Song dynasty had attempted to produce lead cash coins been discovered. Because of this almost no Chinese coin catalogues list their existence while they have mentioned in works such as the Meng Guohua: Guilin Faxian Qian Xi Hejin Qian. Zhongguo Qianbi No. 3. 1994 (Vol. 46.) which deal with the topic.

Besides official coins, counterfeit cash coins would often employ official inscriptions, like Yongzheng Tongbao (雍正通寳), but be made entirely out of lead.

Lead cash coins from southern China were successful outside of China, as the Southern Han Kingdom often exported its lead money to other countries, especially those in what is now Indonesia.

== Han dynasty ==
In a 2005 article in the numismatic journal Xinjiang Numismatics (新疆钱币), it was reported that a number of lead cash coins dating to the Western Han dynasty period were uncovered in a small village in the Ningxia Hui Autonomous Region.

== Tang dynasty ==
After the An Lushan Rebellion, to reduce costs and increase the hardness of coins, the imperial court added more and more lead to alloys of cash coins. During the late Tang dynasty period, some Kaiyuan Tongbao cash coins contained more than 50% lead.

Between 1982 and 2002 the numismatic researcher Qian Boquan (钱伯泉) collected over 5 lead Dali Yuanbao (大曆元寳) cash coins on the Ürümqi coin market. In a 2002 article in the numismatic journal Xinjiang Numismatics (新疆钱币), Qian Boquan reported that these lead Dali Yuanbao vary in size and weight. They range from having a diameter of 26 to 29 millimeters, a thickness of 4 to 5 millimeters, and a weight of 5.7 to 7.8 grams. The obverse and reverse of each cash coin is filled with a yellow-white alkaline patina.

Small amounts of lead Kaiyuan Tongbao cash coins were discovered in coin hoards dating to the reign of Emperor Wuzong.

== Five Dynasties and Ten Kingdoms ==
According to Yang Lien-sheng, from the year 916 lead cash coins were being cast in what is today Fujian, this was followed by the production of iron cash coins shortly afterwards. After this was pioneered in the Fujian region it was adopted by the neighbouring dynasties and kingdoms. During this period bronze cash coins would continue to remain the dominant currency of the countryside, while iron and lead cash coins were widely being circulated in urban areas.

This was a good method to balance imports and exports because foreign tradesmen and merchants could not use the iron and lead cash coins they received as payment in other states, forcing them to spend them locally before they left.

At times, lead cash coins dated to this period are found bearing Inscriptions of which seem to have been omitted from the historical records, for example a lead Guangzheng Tongbao (廣政通寳) cash coin attributed to the Later Shu.

While the southern kingdoms often issued iron and lead cash coins, many regimes in the central plains explicitly forbade their circulation. For example, the Later Tang ordered all iron and lead cash coins within its territory to be collected and destroyed as it saw their circulation as an invitation for counterfeiters to deliberately produce cheap and bad quality money that would negatively affect the economy.

=== Min Kingdom ===
In the year 916, Wang Shenzhi, King of the Min Kingdom began to make lead cash coins, and thereafter, lead coins were circulated along with the traditional copper-alloy coins. This series of small lead coins bore the inscription Kaiyuan Tongbao (開元通寳) on their obverse sides and either had the character Min (閩), Fu (福), or Yin (殷), above the square central hole, on their reverse sides. Some of these lead coins have a crescent below and/or a dot on the left of the square central hole. These cash coins were minted in what is today Ninghua County, Sanming, Fujian after deposits of lead were discovered in the area. These cash coins are collectively referred to as "Min Kaiyuan lead cash coins" (閩開元鉛錢, 闽开元铅钱) by modern Chinese numismatists, and thanks to archeological findings a larger number of variants have been uncovered than was first believed to exist.

In the Kingdom of Min a single bronze Yonglong Tongbao (永隆通寳) was valued at 10 small cash coins and as much as 100 lead cash coins.

=== Ma Chu ===
The minister Gao Yu advised King Wumu of Chu to cast lead and iron cash coins at Changsha in 925, this was because of the abundance of lead and iron in the Hunan region. 1 lead or iron cash coin was nominally worth 10 copper-alloy cash coins, though their region of circulation was largely confined to Changsha. In Changsha the merchants would trade these coins which only benefited the government of the Kingdom of Chu.

The small lead cash coins said to have been cast by this kingdom bore the Inscriptions Qianfeng Quanbao (乾封泉寶) and Qianyuan Zhongbao (乾元重寳), inscriptions previously used by the Tang dynasty for bronze cash coins. Bronze cash coins with this same inscription dated to this period are sometimes attributed to have been produced during the reign of King Wumu, but their usage may have been as funerary items rather than as circulation currency.

In the year 929, the government of the Chu Kingdom officially fixed the value of a lead cash coin as 1/100 of a bronze cash coin. Later, in 962, the royal government issued a decree stipulating that lead cash coins should circulate in urban areas, while bronze cash coins should circulate in the countryside. Those who did not obey this decree risked facing the death penalty.

=== Southern Tang Kingdom ===
The Southern Tang Kingdom issued a lead version of the Tangguo Tongbao (唐國通寳), an inscription which was also used for bronze and iron cash coins.

=== Southern Han Kingdom ===
The Southern Han issued a number of lead cash coins during its existence. The first series of lead cash coins attributed to this kingdom had the inscription Kaiping Yuanbao (開平元寳) and is attributed to the kingdom's founder, Liu Yin. These cash coins were possible cast to commemorate a Liang dynasty period title.

Another series of lead cash coins, that also had bronze equivalents, was the Qianheng Zhongbao (乾亨重寳). Some of these contained the traditional Chinese character "Yong" (邕) on their reverse side.

The "Yong" (邕) on the reverse side of these Qianheng Zhongbao cash coins is believed to mean that they were minted in Yongzhou, today's Nanning and its vicinity in Guangxi. Liu Yu once named his eldest son Liu Yaoshu as "King of Yong" (邕王). Other Qianheng Zhongbao cash coins have the character "Yi" (邑) on their reverse sides, which is said to refer to the capital city, what is today Guangzhou. Wang Guizhen (王贵枕), a Guangdong numismatist, believes that Qianheng Zhongbao lead cash coins with the "Yi" character on their back may have been for the exclusive for Cantonese people prohibiting them from circulating outside of the city.

One of the reasons why lead was used by the Southern Han for coinage is because iron and copper were used for the construction of statues and bells in Buddhist temples, as well as Buddhist pagodas. It is also speculated by modern numismatists that the Southern Han government attempted to circulate lead and bronze cash coins at the same value, but that the market rejected this as copper is significantly more valuable than lead, with 1 bronze cash coin being worth 10 lead cash coins. Government regulations of the Southern Han Kingdom also stipulated that mandarins should be paid in lead cash coins, and only ministers who were particularly favoured by the monarch were paid in bronze cash coins.

The "Spring and Autumn of the Ten Kingdoms" mentions that the use of copper-alloy cash coins and lead cash coins inside and outside Guangzhou began in the year Dabao 5 (962) during the reign of Liu Yu. Wang Yinjia (王蔭嘉 / 王荫嘉), a numismatist during the early Republic of China period, believed that "the economic policy of the Southern Han dynasty is bizarre and inexplicable", stating that "the lead cash coins in the city [Guangzhou] cannot go out of the city gate, disallowing the people from purchasing things outside, how can the public and private trade work? and how can the people make a living in the city, if the copper-alloy cash coins from outside cannot enter the city, how can the people in the city accumulate wealth?" Wang Yinjia asked these questions to fellow numismatist Luo Bozhao (羅伯昭 / 罗伯昭), who wrote "The History of Money in the Southern Han Dynasty" (南漢錢史) in response. The book explained that the use of two kinds of cash coins inside and outside Guangzhou was to drive out bad coins in market transactions. Later numismatists believe that the reason lead cash coins were used in Guangzhou was for the same reason as in Ma Chu, to preserve the wealth of the territory by forcing outside merchants to use less valuable money to maximise the wealth being kept inside through trade with outsiders.

In stark contrast to Qianheng Zhongbao lead cash coins, which are very frequently found in and around Guangzhou in the modern era to the point that between 1953 and 1985 over 250,000 lead cash coins with this inscription weighing 2000 catties were found, Kaiping Yuanbao lead cash coins are very rare in the world today with only sporadic discoveries occurring. This may be the result of their deliberate destruction at the hands of Liu Yan who regarded the Later Liang as a "puppet court" (偽廷) and sought to erase it from history beginning with the eradication of the lead Kaiping Yuanbao cash coins.

==== Southern Han lead cash coins in Indonesia ====
In China, both the people of the Southern Han dynasty and the businessmen who had trade relations with the Southern Han dynasty did not like lead cash coins. However, in some countries outside of China, lead cash coins were not only very popular, but even attracted large-scale imitation by the local people. The Southern Han dynasty established business relations with Japan, Korea, Southeast Asia, India, Persia, and Arabia, though the city of Guangzhou was already an international trade hub in the prior Tang dynasty. A number of trade vessels sent by the Southern Han to what is now Indonesia have been uncovered.

Another interesting phenomenon is that Kaiping Yuanbao lead cash coins, which are rarely found in China, are often unearthed in Palembang, Indonesia.

=== Crude lead coins ===
During the Five Dynasties and Ten Kingdoms period a number of small, poorly made, illiterately written lead cash coins circulated in the Southern Han and Chu area. The origins of these cash coins remain unknown. Chinese characters and inscriptions found on these crude coins are often reversed because the incompetent workmen had not mastered the art of engraving in negative to make the coin moulds. Some specimens of these crude coins likewise have meaningless and nonsensical characters and inscriptions.

These crude lead coins exhibit a great variety due to the incompetence of the workmen, in some instances the character "Kai" (開), as in "Kaiyuan Tongbao", appears to be a "Yong" (用).

Due to their crudeness it is evident that these cash coins were not officially government issued coins, but privately produced coins likely made by merchants or the people.

== Song dynasty ==
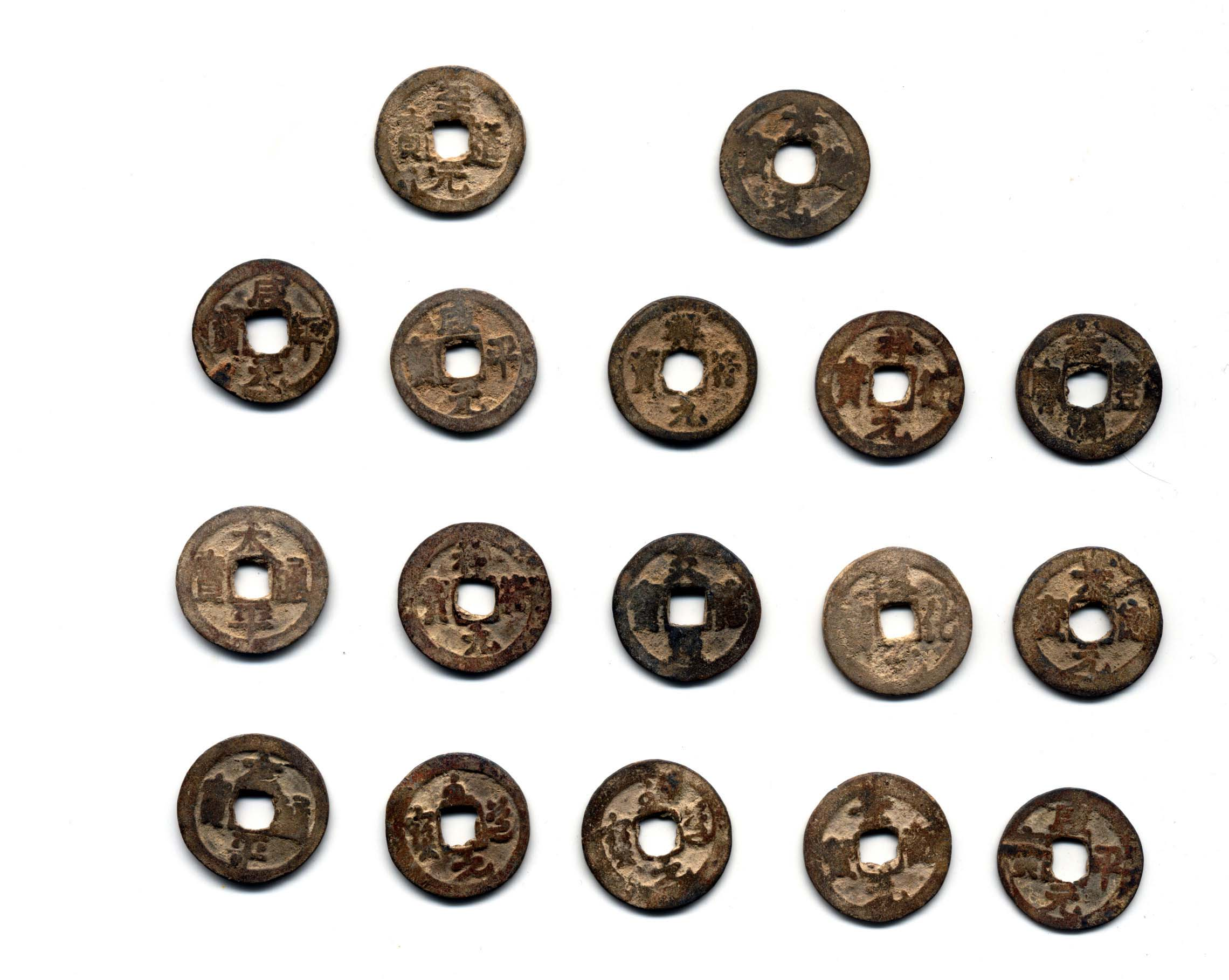
Lead cash coins attributed to the Song dynasty period, these were unknown until relatively recent archeological discoveries.

Until relatively recently, it was not known that the imperial government of the Song dynasty had attempted several times to create lead cash coins.

In a 2011 article in the numismatic journal Jiangsu Numismatics (江苏钱币), numismatic researcher Pan Guorong (潘国荣) described a lead Zhenghe Tongbao (政和通寳) cash coin issued during the reign of Emperor Huizong. The coin had a diameter of 25 millimeters, a thickness of 1.3 millimeters, and a weight of 4.2 grams. Pan Guorong noted that the shape, style, text, and weight were all similar to the regular issues with the same inscript. Pan stated that these characteristics all indicate that this was an official casting and after comparative analysis by a number of other experts in the field it was concluded that this previously unknown lead cash coin is indeed undoubtedly genuine.

== Qing dynasty ==
It was reported in the records of the Qing dynasty that lead cash coins were minted for a brief period in the year 1854, although it seems that these lead cash coins were never actually introduced into the Chinese market and therefore did not circulate. This happened in the context of a monetary crisis where the Qing dynasty government introduced a large number of different types of cash coins, including large denomination cash coins, iron cash coins, and zinc cash coins.

== Taiping Heavenly Kingdom ==
Two series of privately issued lead cash coins, one with the inscription "Shengji Zuoyong" (生記作用), the other with the inscription "Hengji Dangshi" (亨記當十), are said to have circulated as an alternative currency in the Jiaxing Prefecture, Zhejiang during the Taiping Heavenly Kingdom period, following the occupation of the region by the rebel government. Following the establishment of the central government Minting Bureau to issue its own holy currency the lead cash coins were recalled to be melted down. However, a few people did not exchange these lead cash coins to the royal government and a small number of them have been preserved to this day.

According to insiders of the soy sauce making industry, the companies that operated the Shengji (生記) and Hengji (亨記) soy bean gardens had a large business scope during the Qing dynasty period and were also in the business of producing wine, wheat, beans, and rice, to do this they produced utensils made out of tin and lead. Because these two shops were equipped with tin and lead tools and the right equipment to produce lead tools, the lead cash coins produced by them are so well made. During the end of the Qing dynasty period, the people from the Jiaxing region also collected a lot of money from the Taiping Heavenly Kingdom, including the locally produced lead cash coins that served as an alternative currency, leading them to be preserved quite well by the time an article was written about them in the Cultural Relics (文物) journal in 1959.

== List of Chinese lead cash coins ==
Inscription	Traditional Chinese	Simplified Chinese	Country or territory	Catalogue numbers	Obverse image	Reverse image
Early lead cash coins
Yi Hua	一化	一化	Kingdom of Yan			
Ban Liang	半兩	半两	Kingdom of Qin / Qin dynasty			
Ban Liang	半兩	半两	Han dynasty			
Kaiyuan Tongbao - Tan	開元通寳 - 潭	开元通宝 - 潭	Tang dynasty			
Dali Yuanbao	大曆元寳	大历元宝	Tang dynasty			
Five Dynasties and Ten Kingdoms period
Kaiyuan Tongbao – Min (Note: Crescent below on the reverse side.)	開元通寳 – 閩	开元通宝 – 闽	Min Kingdom	Hartill #15.51, FD No. 739		
Kaiyuan Tongbao – Min	開元通寳 – 閩	开元通宝 – 闽	Min Kingdom	Hartill #15.52, FD No. 777		
Kaiyuan Tongbao – Fu	開元通寳 – 福	开元通宝 – 福	Min Kingdom	Hartill #15.53		
Kaiyuan Tongbao – Yin	開元通寳 – 殷	开元通宝 – 殷	Min Kingdom	Hartill #15.54		
Qianyuan Zhongbao	乾元重寳	乾元重宝	Ma Chu	Hartill #15.70		
Qianyuan Zhongbao (Note: Crescent above on the reverse side.)	乾元重寳	乾元重宝	Ma Chu	Hartill #15.70A, DCH #6717 (Note: David Hartill collection number.)		
Tangguo Tongbao	唐國通寳	唐国通宝	Southern Tang	Hartill #15.92		
Kaiping Yuanbao	開平元寳	开平元宝	Southern Han	Hartill #15.105		
Qianheng Zhongbao	乾亨重寳	乾亨重宝	Southern Han	Hartill #15.108, FD #826~		
Qianheng Zhongbao	乾亨重寳	乾亨重宝	Southern Han	Hartill #15.109, FD No. 827		
Qianheng Zhongbao (Inscription reversed)	乾亨重寳	乾亨重宝	Southern Han	Hartill #15.110		
Qianheng Zhongbao (亨 reversed)	乾亨重寳	乾亨重宝	Southern Han	Hartill #15.111		
Qianheng Zhongbao – Yong	乾亨重寳 – 邕	乾亨重宝 – 邕	Southern Han	Hartill #15.112, FD No. 828		
Kaiyuan Tongbao	開元通寳	开元通宝	Attributed to the Southern Han/Chu area	Hartill #15.114		
Kaiyuan Tongbao – Tan	開元通寳 – 潭	开元通宝 – 潭	Attributed to the Southern Han/Chu area	Hartill #15.115		
Kaiyuan Tongbao	開元通寳	开元通宝	Attributed to the Southern Han/Chu area	Hartill #15.116		
Kaiyuan Tongbao – Yi Bao	開元通寳 – 一寶	开元通宝 – 一宝	Attributed to the Southern Han/Chu area	Hartill #15.117		
Kaiyuan Tongbao – Bao Yi	開元通寳 – 寶一	开元通宝 – 宝一	Attributed to the Southern Han/Chu area	Hartill #15.118		
Kaiyuan Tongbao – Bao Er	開元通寳 – 寶二	开元通宝 – 宝二	Attributed to the Southern Han/Chu area	Hartill #15.119		
Kaiyuan Tongbao – Bao Si	開元通寳 – 寶四	开元通宝 – 宝四	Attributed to the Southern Han/Chu area	Hartill #15.120		
Kaiyuan Tongbao – Xing	開元通寳 – 興	开元通宝 – 兴	Attributed to the Southern Han/Chu area	Hartill #15.121		
Kaiyuan Tongbao – Xing Yi	開元通寳 – 興一	开元通宝 – 兴一	Attributed to the Southern Han/Chu area	Hartill #15.122		
Kaiyuan Tongbao – Xing Er	開元通寳 – 興二	开元通宝 – 兴二	Attributed to the Southern Han/Chu area	Hartill #15.123		
Kaiyuan Tongbao – Xing San	開元通寳 – 興三	开元通宝 – 兴三	Attributed to the Southern Han/Chu area	Hartill #15.124		
Kaiyuan Tongbao – Xing Si	開元通寳 – 興四	开元通宝 – 兴四	Attributed to the Southern Han/Chu area	Hartill #15.125		
Kaiyuan Tongbao – Nan Yi	開元通寳 – 南一	开元通宝 – 南一	Attributed to the Southern Han/Chu area	Hartill #15.126		
Kaiyuan Tongbao – Nan Er	開元通寳 – 南二	开元通宝 – 南二	Attributed to the Southern Han/Chu area	Hartill #15.127		
Kaiyuan Tongbao – Nan San	開元通寳 – 南三	开元通宝 – 南三	Attributed to the Southern Han/Chu area	Hartill #15.128		
Kaiyuan Tongbao – Nan Si	開元通寳 – 南四	开元通宝 – 南四	Attributed to the Southern Han/Chu area	Hartill #15.129		
Kaiyuan Tongbao – Shang	開元通寳 – 上	开元通宝 – 上	Attributed to the Southern Han/Chu area	Hartill #15.130		
Kaiyuan Tongbao	開元通寳	开元通宝	Attributed to the Southern Han/Chu area	Hartill #15.131		
Kaiyuan Tongbao	開元通寳	开元通宝	Attributed to the Southern Han/Chu area	Hartill #15.132		
Kaiyuan Tongbao	開元通寳	开元通宝	Attributed to the Southern Han/Chu area	Hartill #15.133		
Kaida Tongbao (Note: The "Da" (大) in the Kai"da" Tongbao is clearly an error meant to read "Yuan" (元).)	開大通寳	开大通宝	Attributed to the Southern Han/Chu area	Hartill #15.134		
Kaida Tongbao – Gui (Note: Guizhou, Guangxi.)	開大通寳 – 桂	开大通宝 – 桂	Attributed to the Southern Han/Chu area	Hartill #15.135		
Kaida Tongbao – Jin Yi	開大通寳 – 金一	开大通宝 – 金一	Attributed to the Southern Han/Chu area	Hartill #15.136		
Kaida Tongbao – Jin Er	開大通寳 – 金二	开大通宝 – 金二	Attributed to the Southern Han/Chu area	Hartill #15.137		
Kaida Tongbao – Jin San	開大通寳 – 金三	开大通宝 – 金三	Attributed to the Southern Han/Chu area	Hartill #15.138		
Kaida Tongbao – Jin Si	開大通寳 – 金四	开大通宝 – 金四	Attributed to the Southern Han/Chu area	Hartill #15.139		
Kaida Tongbao – Yi	開大通寳 – 一	开大通宝 – 一	Attributed to the Southern Han/Chu area	Hartill #15.140		
Kaida Tongbao – Er	開大通寳 – 二	开大通宝 – 二	Attributed to the Southern Han/Chu area	Hartill #15.141		
Kaida Tongbao – San	開大通寳 – 三	开大通宝 – 三	Attributed to the Southern Han/Chu area	Hartill #15.142		
Kaida Tongbao – Si	開大通寳 – 四	开大通宝 – 四	Attributed to the Southern Han/Chu area	Hartill #15.143		
Kaiyuan Zhongbao (Note: These lead cash coins are small, despite the "Zhong" (重, "Heavy") in the inscription.)	開元重寳	开元重宝	Attributed to the Southern Han/Chu area	Hartill #15.144		
Wu Wu	五五	五五	Attributed to the Southern Han/Chu area	Hartill #15.145		
Wu Wu	五五	五五	Attributed to the Southern Han/Chu area	Hartill #15.146		
Wu Wu – Nan	五五 – 南	五五 – 南	Attributed to the Southern Han/Chu area	Hartill #15.147		
Wu Wu – Bao	五五 – 寶	五五 – 宝	Attributed to the Southern Han/Chu area	Hartill #15.148		
Wu Wu – Xing	五五 – 興	五五 – 兴	Attributed to the Southern Han/Chu area	Hartill #15.149		
Wu Wu – Jin San	五五 – 金三	五五 – 金三	Attributed to the Southern Han/Chu area	Hartill #15.150		
Wu Wu (Note: Crescent above.)	五五	五五	Attributed to the Southern Han/Chu area	Hartill #15.151		
Wu Wu (Note: Crescent above and below.)	五五	五五	Attributed to the Southern Han/Chu area	Hartill #15.152		
Wu Wu – Huo Quan	五五 – 貨泉	五五 – 货泉	Attributed to the Southern Han/Chu area	Hartill #15.153		
Wu Wu Wu Wu	五五五五	五五五五	Attributed to the Southern Han/Chu area	Hartill #15.154		
Wu Zhu (Note: The "釒" radical of the "Zhu" (銖) is mising.)	五朱	五朱	Attributed to the Southern Han/Chu area	Hartill #15.155		
Wu Zhu Wan Wan (Note: The two swastika symbols, which also found on a number of older Wu Zhu cash coins, in this context is an ancient Chinese symbol which is believed to represent the Traditional Chinese character for "ten-thousand" (萬 / 万). One of the meanings of this symbol is "a lot" or "many".)	五銖卍卍	五铢卍卍	Attributed to the Southern Han/Chu area			
Kaiyuan Wu Wu	開元五五	开元五五	Attributed to the Southern Han/Chu area	Hartill #15.156		
Qing dynasty
Xianfeng Zhongbao - Dang Shi Boo Ciowan	咸豐重寳 - 當 十 ᠪᠣᠣ ᠴᡳᠣᠸᠠᠨ	咸丰重宝 - 当 十 ᠪᠣᠣ ᠴᡳᠣᠸᠠᠨ	Qing dynasty			

== Trần dynasty ==
The book "Historical Currency of Vietnam" (越南歷史貨幣) claims that after the war with the Yuan dynasty (Mongol Empire), the supply of copper in Đại Việt was insufficient. To restore the economy as soon as possible, the government of the Trần dynasty began to mint lead cash coins in 1323.

== Nguyễn lords ==
There is a lead cash coin with the inscription Thiên Minh Thông Bảo (天明通寳) produced in the Quảng Nam province. These cash coins are attributed to the Nguyễn lords during the reign of the Thế tông Hiếu vũ Hoàng đế (lord Nguyễn Phúc Khoát).

== Nguyễn dynasty ==
In his 1882 book Annam and its Minor Currency (pdf), the Spanish (Catalan) Egyptologist Eduardo Toda y Güell reported on the circulation of lead cash coins introduced during the Nguyễn dynasty with the inscriptions Gia Long Thông Bảo (嘉隆通寳), Thiệu Trị Thông Bảo (紹治通寳), and Tự Đức Thông Bảo (嗣德通寳). Toda wrote that "Nearly every kind of metal has been used in Annam in the manufacture of coins, and there are now in circulation coins made of gold, silver, copper, zinc, and lead; and up to within a short time ago there were also coins made of iron". According to Toda, the Gia Long Emperor was the first monarch to issue lead cash coins and that the value of a lead cash coin was even lower than that of a zinc cash coin, but that generally speaking Vietnamese people rarely used lead coins. There were no laws that regulated the different standards of copper, zinc, and lead cash coins and their value was completely dependent on what market decided. In international trade ports their price was dependent on the Mexican peso.

There were 2 versions of the lead Gia Long Thông Bảo cash coin, one with a plain reverse and one with the characters Thất phần (七分). The lead Thiệu Trị Thông Bảo is a small size cash coin with a plain reverse, cash coins of the same design were also made of copper and zinc. Toda attributed 2 lead cash coins to the reign of the Tự Đức Emperor, one was a small size one that also made in zinc and copper and another one with the characters Hà Nội (河內) on its reverse side, indicating its place of production.

Toda reported that during the Lê Văn Khôi revolt, the rebel forces under Lê Văn Khôi produced lead cash coins with the inscription Trị Nguyên Thông Bảo (治元通寳), these coins featured a crescent and a dot on the right and left of the square central hole on their reverse sides.

== Local cash coins of the Bakumatsu ==
During the Bakumatsu the Sendai Domain, Echigo Province, Awa Province, and the Yonezawa Domain produced lead coins.

=== Sendai Domain ===
During the Bakumatsu the Sendai Domain produced lead cash coins using lead collected from the Hosokura mine. The lead cash coins produced by the Sendai domain were square in shape and had the inscription Hosokura tō hyaku (細倉當百), the Hosokura tō hyaku is said to have been used to pay the salaries of craftsmen in the mine. The reverse side of these cash coins contain a stylised character that is said to be the kaō of Fujiwara no Hidehira. It seems almost certain that lead from the Hosokura mine was used, and the results of lead isotope ratio measurements support this. During this same period the Sendai Domain circulated a square iron cash coin with the inscription Sendai Tsūhō (仙臺通寳).

=== Yonezawa Domain ===
The Yonezawa Domain issued lead cash coins known as Seisankyoku-ensen (生産局鉛銭), these were minted in the Dewa Province, probably sometime around 1866. At this time, the Samurai class of this domain found their occupation gone, which caused great distress for many of them. A society to aid and supervision these samurai was formed under the local government, and these heavy lead coins were issued to these samurai as a form of government sponsored aid. These cash coins were either oval or square and had the inscription Ka-nihyaku (價二百) written in regular script, indicating that they had a nominal value of 200 mon. The Inscription of this lead cash coin further includes 4 vertically written characters, on the right of the square central hole, indicating coin's weight in Japanese units reading Sanjūyon-monme (三十四匁, 34 monme).

== Hoards of lead cash coins ==
- In December 1953, at the construction site of new buildings in the eastern suburbs of Guangzhou, construction workers employed by at the Mayugang (孖鱼冈) new village construction site discovered a pile of lead Qianheng Zhongbao (乾亨重寳) cash coins, weighing as much as 20 catties, was found buried in a small underground pit. No ancient tombs or other artifacts were found. The construction workers took out the coins and sent them to the Municipal Cultural Management Committee for preservation. This would prove the first discovery, as between December 1953 and 1958 a total of a total of 1200 catties worth of lead cash coins dated to the Southern Han period would be unearthed in Guangzhou.
- In 1980, when the Administrative Office of the General Office of the Guangdong Provincial Committee of the Chinese Communist Party was carrying out residential construction in Meihua Village (梅花村), Dongshan District (东山), Guangzhou City (广州市) in the Guangdong, a four-eared black-glazed pot weighing about 20 kg was found 1.2 meters below the ground. The pot contained a batch of lead cash coins with the inscription Qianheng Zhongbao (乾亨重寳) dated to the Southern Han Kingdom. The lead cash coins were placed vertically and bonded together inside of the pot and all of them suffered from corrosion. All lead cash coins in the hoard seem to be divided into two specifications, one with a diameter of 2.5–2.6 cm, and the other with a diameter of 2.5–2.7 cm. The reverse sides of all these cash coins are blank. The thickness of the cash coins is uneven, and their casting quality is very poor.
- In 2003, Ziquan Neihua (兹泉内化) copper-alloy coins and a number of lead cash coins were found in the ancient ruins of the Taklamakan Desert in Luopu County, Xinjiang Uygur Autonomous Region.
- In 2007 a group of Indonesian fishermen discovered a small overgrown jarlet that was hooked onto a net that they early had cast into the sea while fishing in the Java Sea, after reporting this to people they knew ashore the salvage company PT Nautik Recovery Asia was sent to salvage in the area. The expeditions revealed a wreck of an old ship after ceramics were found. In June 2008, the team working on it discovered the wreck of a cargo ship exporting Chinese, South Asian, and Middle Eastern products to be shipped to the island of Java, the find included lead Kaiyuan Tongbao cash coins cast by the Min Kingdom with "Min" (闽) or "Fu" (福) reverse inscriptions, as well as lead Qianheng Zhongbao cash coins cast by the Southern Han Kingdom.

== Presence of lead in copper-alloy cash coins ==
=== Chinese cash coins ===
Research by the British Museum found that cash coins were always leaded, the usage of leaded copper was found to be present in both bronze and brass alloys. Though the research indicated that the percentages of lead was remarkably lower in the brass alloys from the early 16th century onwards. An analysis of the lead content in Chinese cash coins from history revealed that the lead content typically ranges from 10% to 20%, with the highest recorded lead percentage being found in 12th and 13th century bronze cash coins standing at 30% (which occurred during a time period of severe copper scarcity). Meanwhile, the percentage of lead found in brass cash coins was on average 5%, typically ranging from 2% to 8%. Cao Jin (曹晉), a researcher at the Department of Chinese and Korean Studies, Tübingen University, in her paper Mints and Minting in Late Imperial China: Technology, Organisation and Problems pointed out that there were mainly 2 reasons for this, one of which was economic and the other technical. She noted that the addition of lead was cheaper than other metals such as tin, zinc, or using more copper as lead was relatively cheap compared to other metals. Furthermore, she noted that the technical reason was because the addition of lead to copper-alloys boosted the fluidity of the melt, which facilitated the manufacturing process and qualitatively helped to improve the result. Cao Jin further argued that a lower percentage of lead during later periods can be attributed to the fact that only 3% lead is needed in a copper-alloy for a desired level of fluidity, concluding that the presence of high percentages of lead can mostly be attributed to economic reasons for the earlier cash coins and for technical reasons during later periods when copper scarcity was less of an issue.

=== Japanese cash coins ===
Lead was used for the mintage of Japanese cash coins, this lead was sometimes domestically supplied and sometimes imported. During the ancient period until around the 8th century the lead was mostly collected from the Naganobori mine and its neighbouring mines in the Nagato Province. A limited quantity of lead was also collected from the Buzen Province, although it was rarely used. During the medieval period the majority of lead came from China, while Chinese lead was mostly used until the 14th century, Japanese lead would supersede its usage and Chinese lead would almost completely disappear, though small amounts of non-Chinese foreign lead would also be used. During the Edo period. Japanese lead was mostly used, in the latter half of the 17th century most lead used in the alloys of cash coins came from the Taishu mine on Tsushima island. A century later lead would be supplied from multiple places across Japan and eventually the mints would come to depend on the Tōhoku region to supply the lead used in the production of cash coins.

== Notes ==
=== Catalogue numbers ===
- Hartill = Cast Chinese Coins by David Hartill. Trafford, United Kingdom: Trafford Publishing. September 22, 2005. ISBN 978-1412054669.
- FD = Fisher's Ding (丁), George A. Fisher's copy of Ding Fubao's (丁福保) original work catalogue, 1980, 251 pages.
- Schjøth = "Chinese Currency, Currency of the Far East – A Comprehensive Text Chou Dynasty, 1122 B.C.–255 B.C. Through Ch'ing Dynasty 1644 A.D.–1911 A.D." by Fredrik Schjøth and Virgil Hancock, Oslow, Norway, 1929.
- Hartill-Qing = Qing Cash (清代貨幣) by David Hartill, Royal Numismatic Society (2003).
- Krause = C.L. Krause and C. Mishler, Standard Catalog of World Coins, Krause Publications, 1979.

== Sources ==
- Hartill, David (2005). Cast Chinese Coins: A Historical Catalogue.
