= Banliang =

Chinese cash coin

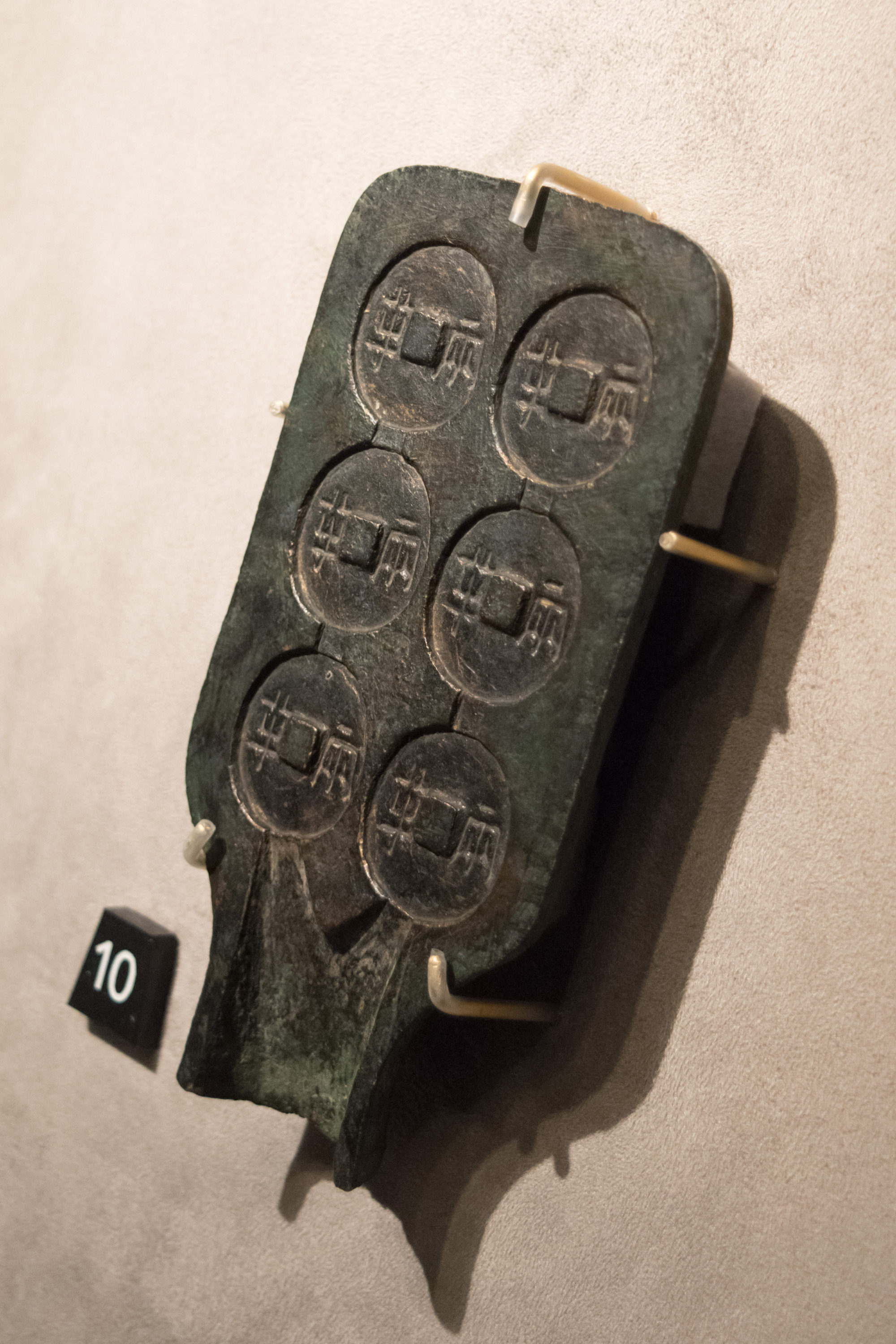
Bronze mold for minting banliang coins, Warring States period (c. 475 – 221 BC), state of Qin, from an excavation in Qishan County, Baoji, Shaanxi

The banliang (Chinese: 半兩; pinyin: bànliǎng) was the first unified currency in imperial Chinese history, first minted as early as 378 BC and introduced by the first emperor Qin Shi Huang around 210 BC (although coins with this inscription already circulated in the state of Qin prior to unification). It was round with a square hole in the middle. Before that date, a variety of coins were used in China, usually in the form of blades (knife money, spade money) or other implements, though round coins with square holes were used by the state of Zhou before it was extinguished by Qin in 249 BCE.

The Ban Liang corresponds to a half tael (半兩), or twelve zhu (銖, about 0.68 grams). It typically weighs between ten and six grams, roughly corresponding to the Greek stater.

The standardization of currency with this round coinage was part of a broader plan to unify weights and measures during the Qin empire. Ban Liang coins continued to be used under the Western Han dynasty until they were finally replaced by the Wu Zhu cash coins in 118 BC.

== History ==
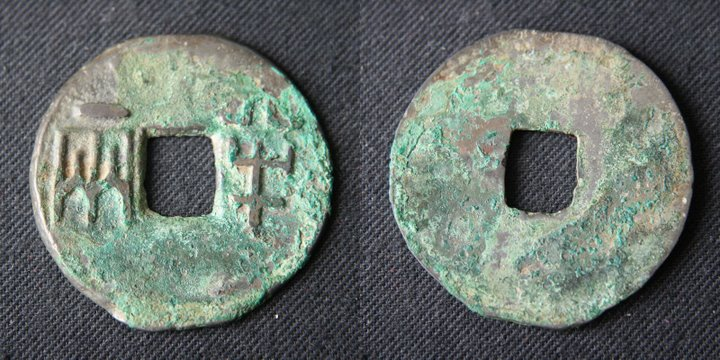
A Ban Liang cash coin cast under the reign of Empress Bo during the Western Han dynasty.

=== State of Qin ===
The Ban Liang coins predate the Chinese Empire and were originally cast during the Warring states period by the State of Qin; these coins circulated alongside cloth money. Qin State coins were inscribed with the Chinese characters Zhu zhong yi liang" (珠重一兩; 'pearls (round coins) heavy one liang'), which might have been a kind of lot number, while other early State of Qin weighed half a tael or one zī (锱; 錙), which was six zhu. 1 tael coins tended to have a round centre hole, and half tael coins a square hole. The reverse side of all of these early round coins were blank.

The Ban Liang cash coins of the Warring States period typically have a diameter between 32 and 34 millimeters and weight of 8 grams. The Ban Liang cash coins produced by the State of Qin have rectangular centre holes, as opposed to later cash coins which have square holes and many earlier Huanqian which had round holes.

Ban Liang cash coins during this era were cast in two-piece moulds (錢范; 钱范; qián fàn) and these moulds could produce 6 cash coins at a time. This casting method left only one sprue on the coins.

State of Qin era Ban Liang cash coins generally have inscriptions that are written in small seal script, with a small number in large seal script. The characters on the State of Qin Ban Liang cash coins are vertically elongated and the top horizontal stroke of the "Liang" (兩) character is short. A seal script evolved further over the centuries, the top horizontal line became longer as is seen in Ban Liang cash coins produced during the time of the Han dynasty.

=== Qin dynasty ===
Emperor Qin Shi Huang conquered the various "warring states" and unified China in the year 221 BC forming the Qin dynasty. In order to consolidate central power of the new Qin dynasty, Qin Shi Huang proceeded to standardise the various scripts, weights, and measures that existed among the various states. In order to centralise and standardise the Chinese monetary system, Qin Shi Huang had abolished the existing forms of money. He then stipulated that the new monetary system of the Qin dynasty would consist of a two tier system with a "higher" form of currency (上幣) made of gold and a "lower" form of currency (下幣) made of bronze, which was the Ban Liang.

The Qin dynasty's Ban Liang cash coin was introduced as a way to standardise all forms of currency and its name reflected this as it would always weigh half a tael; these coins were mostly made from bronze, though a silver Ban Liang variant is known to exist. According to the standard "weights and measures" (度量衡) of Qin, one tael was 24 zhu (equivalent to about 14.4 grams). A "Ban Liang" cash coin, which means "half liang" or "half tael", would therefore be about 7.2 grams in weight. The Ban Liang cash coins further introduced the tradition of stringing coins together with a rope for convenience; this was because of its round shape with a square hole, something future Chinese coins would continue to do until the early days of the Republic of China in the 1910s AD.

The inscription written on Qin dynasty era Ban Liang cash coins are all written in seal script with long and narrow characters that were written in a primal freehand style. Early Ban Liang cash coins tended to not be well finished, furthermore these coins tended to not be quite round as their rims were often not filed smooth.

=== Han dynasty ===
During the Han dynasty Ban Liang coins continued to be produced, but the golden currency established under the Qin would switch from being measured in taels to being measured in "Jin" (斤), which made a single Jin-denominated gold coin worth around 10.000 Ban Liang coins. As the general populace found inconvenience in using the heavy Ban Liang coins the Han government allowed for the private production of smaller Ban Liang coins known as "elm seed" (榆莢) Ban Liang coins. The design of the Ban Liang coins would also change as Han dynasty Ban Liangs would later add rims while all Qin dynasty versions were rimless.

In the year 186 BC, or the 5th year of Empress Lü, the government officially set the weight of the Ban Liang at 8 zhu and the inscription was now written in clerical script.

In the year 182 BC, or the sixth year of Empress Lü, the government of the Han dynasty began cast Ban Liang cash coins with a weight of 2.4 zhu. These cash coins had a diameter that was only about 20 millimeters, and they were distinguished by a large square centre hole. Because in reality they were only worth one-fifth of an earlier Ban Liang coin, they are usually referred to as "5 parts Ban Liang cash coins" (五分半兩錢).

In the year 175 BC, or the fifth year of Emperor Wen, the government of the Han dynasty set the weight of the Ban Liang cash coins at 4 zhu. These cash coins typically have a diameter between 23 and 25 millimeters and they tend to have a weight of 3 grams or less. Some 4 zhu Ban Liang cash coins have an outer rim, while a far fewer number of this type of Ban Liang have both an outside rim as well as an inside rim located around the square centre hole.

Eventually the private production of coinage led to a major disruption in the economy forcing the government to produce larger Ban Liang; eventually, the Han government continue to change the size and weight of the Ban Liang weighing as light as 2.4 Zhu to 4 Zhu. In 119 BC Emperor Wu ordered the Ban Liang coins to be deprecated in favour of "San Zhu" cash coins (三銖), which in turn were superseded by the "Wu Zhu" (五銖) series of coins in 118 BC. Despite being superseded by cash coinages with other inscriptions, the Ban Liang would continue to circulate in the Han dynasty.

== Variants ==
During their period of production many types of Ban Liang coins were cast, ranging largely in weight and size, some had extra holes, while other were written in different fonts such as the Han dynasty coins cast under Empress Lü written in Regular script, or a rare Ban Liang made from silver in the Qin dynasty, an iron variant, and a lead variant in the Han dynasty. A variant with a reverse inscription known as “Liang Ban” (兩半) coins were also cast, cash coins with reverse inscriptions are known as chuan xing (傳形).

During the Warring states period Ban Liang coins from the State of Qin generally had 8 gram Ban Liang coins from between 32 and 34 millimeters in diameter, while during the Qin dynasty all Ban Liang coins generally had a weight of 6 grams and were about 31.7 millimeters in diameters. Han dynasty era Ban Liang coins are generally smaller than Qin Ban Liang coins, this is due to the Han dynasty government constantly changing weight standards for the coins many variants from that era exist.

=== Western Han dynasty variants ===
Western Han dynasty variants include:

| Type | Weight (in grams) | Diameter (in millimeters) | Metal | Emperor | Image |
|---|---|---|---|---|---|
| 8 Zhu Ban Liang (八銖半兩) | 4.8-5.3 | 26-30 | Bronze | Empress Lü | |
| 5 Part Ban Liang (五分半兩) | 1.5 | 20 | Bronze | Empress Lü | |
| Snake eye Ban Liang (蛇目半兩) | 2.7 | 23.4 | Bronze | Empress Lü | |
| 4 Zhu Ban Liang (四銖半兩) | ≤3 | 23-25 | Bronze | Emperor Wen | |
| 4 Zhu Ban Liang (四銖半兩) | 3.5 | 23.5 | Lead | Emperor Wen | |

=== Silver Ban Liang cash coins ===
During the 1950s, a number of Ban Liang cash coins were unearthed at a site somewhere near the city of Xi'an, Shaanxi. Among the excavated cash coins was one notable silver specimen, this cash coin notably has a diameter of 66 millimeters, a thickness of 7 millimeters, and a weight of 96.15 grams, compared to most State of Qin Ban Liang cash coins made from bronze which typically have a diameter between 32 and 34 millimeters and weigh only 8 grams.

This silver Ban Liang cash coin was acquired by Ma Dingxiang (马定祥; 馬定祥; mǎ dìng xiáng), a person notable for being one of the most famous 20th-century Chinese coin collectors. Ma Dingxiang had acquired this specimen from a friend and fellow numismatist in the city of Xi'an. This is the only known specimen of this type of coin and it was sold at auction in the year 2011 for the equivalent of $334,103 (or 2,070,000 yuan).

Among those who had the chance to admire this silver Ban Liang cash coin during the life of Ma Dingxiang were some other famous and notable Chinese numismatists of the time, including Luo Bozhao (罗伯昭; 羅伯昭; luó bó zhāo), Sun Ding (孙鼎; 孫鼎; sūn dǐng), and Li Weixian (李伟先; 李偉先; lǐ wěi xiān).

Guān Hànhēng (关汉亨; 關漢亨) wrote in his book Bàn liǎng huò bì tú shuō (半两货币图说; 半兩貨幣圖說), after carefully examining the known photographs and rubbings of this unique silver Ban Liang cash coin, that this specimen has clearly been buried for around two millennia due to the oxidation and present on the cash coin, as well as some minor cracks on its reverse which he claims cannot have been artificially added. Furthermore, Guan Henheng adds that despite the production of the Ban Liang cash coins having persisted into the early Han dynasty, he notes that because of the way that it has been cast that it must have been created during the Warring States period because the specimen only has a single sprue and would have been cast using a two-piece mould. The sprue of this specimen is 17 millimeters and is located at the bottom of the coin, meaning that it must have been one of the two cash coins located at the top of the casting mould. Another reason why this silver Ban Liang is likely to have been cast by the State of Qin is that both its shape and its appearance are consistent with the Ban Liang cash coins from the time period, for example its centre hole is shaped like a rectangle as opposed to square as was the rule during the Han period, and the top and bottom horizontal lines of this specimen have bent corners also typical for Qin Ban Liang.

==== Possible functions of the silver variant ====
- It may be possible that this silver Ban Liang cash coin was cast to serve as an official weight to be used with a scale to confirm that indeed 14 regular Ban Liang cash coins would meet the required weight of about 100 grams (100/14 = 7.14). While today this silver coin has a weight of 96.15 grams, it might have been closer to 100 grams in weight when it was cast, but the coin may have lost some of its weight due to wear and oxidation. This proposed original weight would have been the equivalent of 14 government minted cash coins of standard weight. It is entirely possible that an official coin weight like this could very well have been cast in silver in order to signify its importance.
- Guan Hanheng proposes that this silver coin may have been a commemorative issue. Guan claims that there were two important events that took place during the early Qin era that could have resulted in the issuance of a commemorative coin. The first event proposed by Guan Hanheng occurred in the year 336 BC which was the second year of the reign of King Huiwen of Qin and the first year that Ban Liang cash coins were ever issued. And the second event proposed by Guan Hanheng that could have inspired the issuance of commemorative coinage was the unification of China under Emperor Qin Shi Huang in the year 221 BC establishing the Qin dynasty. However, no known historical records have ever mentioned that Emperor Qin Shi Huang had ordered the casting of any type of special commemorative Ban Liang cash coin to mark this occasion. Because of the unlikeliness that it was cast to commemorate the establishment of the Qin dynasty and the fact that Ma Dingxiang during all the years that he had owned this silver Ban Liang cash coin had never personally suggested or proposed that it may have been made cast as a commemorative issue, Guan Hanheng assumes that it is more likely to have been issued in 336 BC. It is furthermore worthy to note that throughout Chinese history, when a new imperial reign had started or a new dynasty was founded, or a new government mint was established, a special cash commemorative coin (開爐錢) would frequently be produced to mark the occasion. These commemorative cash coins tended to be bigger in size than normal issue cash coins and they were often very well-crafted and tended to be made of very good metal alloys.

=== "Drilled holes" Ban Liang cash coins ===
Some Ban Liang cash coins have been discovered that have drilled holes, some of these cash coins have only one additional holes drilled into them while others have two. These cash coins were first documented in the Volume One 2010 edition of "China Numismatics" (中国钱币; 中國錢幣; zhōng guó qián bì), which has an article entitled "Zhangjiachuan Prefecture Excavates 'Drilled Hole' Ban Liang". In this article the author explains that in the summer of the year 2006 he had purchased about two-hundred recently discovered and unearthed Ban Liang cash coins. These cash coins were excavated in the Zhangjiachuan Hui Autonomous County of the Gansu Province in located in northwest China. These Ban Liang cash coins were quite notable because they have never been documented in any prior Chinese numismatic literature.

According to the author of the article, these "drilled hole" Ban Liang cash coins were produced by the State of Qin somewhere around the middle to the end of the Warring States period. These "drilled holes" are mostly found outside of the areas where the Chinese characters are located and the authors of the 2010 article assumes that they have been drilled into them after they have already been cast, meaning that these holes were not the result of a poor manufacturing process.

According to the author of the 2010 article these Ban Liang cash coins were not meant to be used as an ornament or as a pendant because the inconvenient off-centre placement of these additionally drilled holes would not allow the cash coin to be hung correctly.

According to Gary Ashkenazy of the website Primaltrek, it is likely that these Ban Liang cash coins could have been used as burial objects, since coins were associated with wealth in traditional Chinese culture. Furthermore, Gary Ashkenazy hypothesises that these drilled holes might have been a precursor to the "stars" (星, dots), "moons" (月, crescents), and "suns" (日, circles) found on some Ban Liang cash coins during the Western Han dynasty, which were a primitive form of Chinese numismatic charms, as these symbols gradually developed to become more and more complex until they would finally developed into true Chinese numismatic charms and amulets during the Han dynasty period.

The "drilled hole" Ban Liang cash coins range in diameter from 23 to 33 millimeters and in weight from 1 gram to 8 grams.

=== Privately cast Ban Liang cash coins ===
During the early Han dynasty period (200–180 BC), the emperor had ordered the rich and powerful to privately cast Ban Liang cash coins. These privately produced cash coins tended to be diminutive in size and light in weight, they are referred to as "Elm Seed Ban Liang cash coins" (榆荚半兩錢). Some of these "Elm Seed" cash coins were as small as 10 millimeters in diamer and weighing only about 0.4 gram.

Some privately produced Ban Liang cash coins had the Chinese characters for "twenty" (二十) incused or engraved above the square centre hole. Current speculation on this variant is that numbers like this did not in fact refer to the "value" (or denomination) of the cash coin, but that these numbers would rather refer to some still unknown "quantity" or "measure".

Deng Tong (鄧通) was a wealthy businessman who had a close personal relationship with Emperor Wen of the Han dynasty. During a period of 3 years, Emperor Wen had allowed Deng Tong to privately produce Ban Liang cash coins. In order to differentiate his cash coins from those that were officially cast by the imperial government, Deng Tong added extra metal above and below the square centre hole of these Ban Liang cash coins. Since there was "more" metal (or value), these privately produced Ban Liang cash coins by Deng Tong were believed to bring more "happiness" (多福).

=== Iron Ban Liang cash coins ===
It is possible that China first began using iron cash coins (鐡錢; tieqian) during the Western Han dynasty, this was concluded after a number of iron Ban Liang cash coins were unearthed in Western Han era tombs in the Hunanese cities of Hengyang and Changsha between the years 1955 and 1959. Other specimens of iron Ban Liang cash coins were also unearthed in the province of Sichuan.

== Numismatics ==
Historically Ban Liang coins were very rare in the numismatic community, but as many of them were excavated and exported from China in the 1990s they have become extremely common today with their prices having been dramatically decreased as a result.

== See also ==
- Zhou dynasty coinage
- Cash (Chinese coin)
- Chinese cash (currency unit)
- Kaiyuan Tongbao

== Sources ==
- Hartill, David (2005). Cast Chinese Coins. Trafford, United Kingdom. ISBN 1412054664
