= Knife money =

Historical money of China

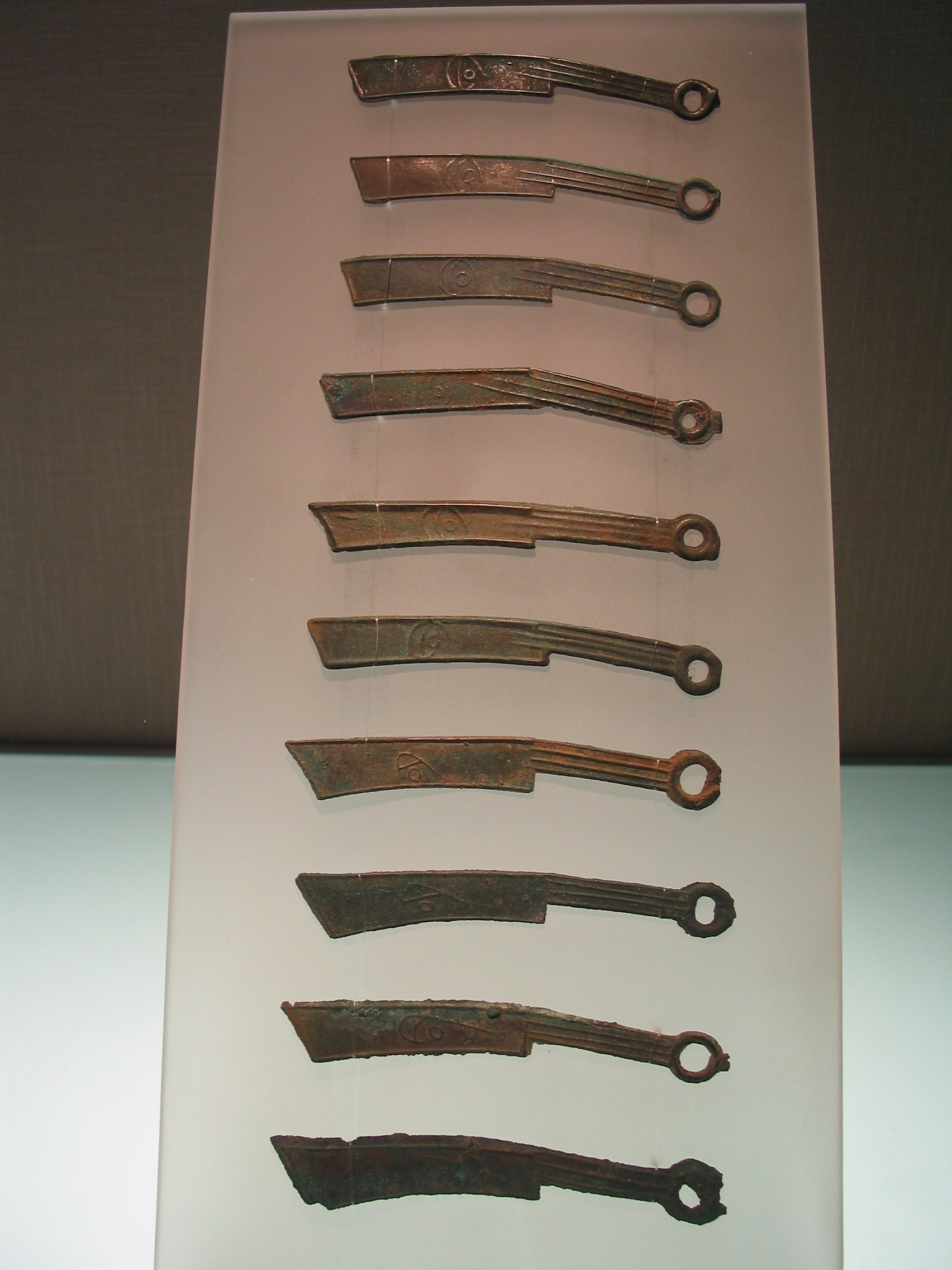
- Yan State knife money
- Traditional Chinese: 刀幣
- Simplified Chinese: 刀币
- Literal meaning: Knife coin
Transcriptions
Standard Mandarin
- Hanyu Pinyin: dāobì

Alternative Chinese name
- Traditional Chinese: 刀錢
- Simplified Chinese: 刀钱
- Literal meaning: Knife money
Transcriptions
Standard Mandarin
- Hanyu Pinyin: dāoqián

Second alternative Chinese name
- Traditional Chinese: 金錯刀
- Simplified Chinese: 金错刀
- Literal meaning: Gold-plated knife
Transcriptions
Standard Mandarin
- Hanyu Pinyin: jīn cuò dāo

Knife money (Chinese: 刀币) is the name of large, cast, bronze, knife-shaped commodity money produced by various governments and kingdoms in what is now China, approximately 2,500 years ago. Knife money circulated in China between 600 and 200 BCE during the Zhou dynasty.

== History ==
There are several stories that attempt to explain how knife money was introduced but it is not certain if any or all are true. In one of the stories, a prince who was running low on money to pay his troops allowed them to use their knives as a form of currency to barter with villagers, and the medium became so popular that it became generally accepted. In another story, the same prince began accepting knives as payment for small fines in place of the current legal ring money.

== Classification ==
Knife money is much the same shape as the actual knives in use during the Zhou period. They appear to have evolved in parallel with the spade money in the north-east of China.

- Qi knives: These large knives are attributed to the State of Qi, and are found in the Shandong area. They do not appear to have circulated much outside of this area. Although there has been considerable controversy concerning the date of their issue, archaeology shows them to be products of the Warring States period. They are known as Three Character Knives, Four Character Knives and so on, according to the number of characters in their inscriptions. Some consider the three horizontal lines and the mark below on some reverses as part of the inscription. The inscription refers to the establishment of the State of Qi. This could have been in 1122 BC, 894 BC, 685 BC, or 386 BC, depending on how one interprets the early histories. The two later dates are the most likely for the introduction of these coins. The alloy of the Three Character Knives contains around 54% copper, 38% lead, and 8% tin. The Four and Five Character Knives contain about 70% copper.
- Needle tip knives: This type of knife money is distinguished by their long pointed tip. They were unknown until 1932, when a hoard was unearthed at Chengde in Hebei province; later hoards have also been found in this area. It has been suggested that such knives were produced for the trade between the Chinese and the Xiongnu (Huns) who occupied this northern area at the time. It could be that this type was merely a local variation of the Pointed Tip knives, or that it was the original type that became modified as it was inconvenient to use. Some fifty inscriptions have been recorded, which consist of numbers, cyclical characters, and other characters, many of which have not been deciphered.
- Pointed tip knives (尖首刀): The end of the blade is curved but lacks the long pointed tip of the needle tip knives. The find spots of this type of knife money in the north-east of China associate it with the State of Yan. In recent years, hoards of up to 2,000 of these knives have been found, sometimes tied together in bundles of 25, 50, or 100. Over 160 different inscriptions have been recorded. Some inscriptions represent numbers or cyclical characters, but many have not been deciphered. Unlike the hollow handle spade money, the characters have not been generally associated with known places names. Their sizes and weights (11 to 16 grams) are very variable, leading to various sub-types being proposed by various authorities.
- Ming knives (明刀): Ming knives are generally smaller than pointed tip knives, and their tips are approximately straight. This type of knife money takes its name from the character on the obverse, which has traditionally been read as ming (Chinese: 明; pinyin: míng). Other proposals have been yi (易; yì), ju (莒; jǔ), ming (盟; méng), and zhao (召; zhào). A mint for Ming knives was unearthed at Xiadu, to the south west of Beijing. This was the site of Yi, capital of the State of Yan from 360 BC, so the reading of yi has found favour recently. Moulds have also been discovered in Shandong. These coins themselves have been found, often in great quantities, in the provinces of Hebei, Henan, Shandong, Shanxi, and Shaanxi; in northeast China; and even as far afield as Korea and Japan. They are found together with pointed and square foot spade money.

Two different shapes of Ming knife are found. The first, presumably the earlier, is curved like the pointed tip knives. The second has a straight blade and often a pronounced angled bend in the middle. This shape is known as 磬 qing, a chime stone. Their alloy contains around 40% copper; they weigh around 16 grams.

A wide range of characters are found on the reverses of Ming knives. Some are single characters or numerals, similar to those found on the pointed tip knives. Two large groups have inscriptions that begin with the characters you (右; yòu; 'right') or zuo(左; zuǒ; 'left'), followed by numerals or other characters. You has the subsidiary meaning of junior or west; zuo can also mean senior or east. (The excavations at Xiadu revealed in the inner city a zuo gong left-hand palace, and a you gong right-hand palace.) The similarities between the other characters in these two groups show that they were determined by the same system. A smaller group has inscriptions beginning with wai (外; wài; 'outside'), but the other characters do not have much in common with the you and zuo groups. A fourth group has inscriptions beginning with an unclear character, and other characters similar to those found in the you and zuo groups. By analogy with thewai, this unclear character has been read as nei (内; nèi; 'inside') or zhong (中; zhōng; 'centre').

- State of Qi Ming knives (Boshan knives): Their general appearance is similar to the Ming knives. The ming character is large and angular. They have extensive reverse inscriptions. A hoard of these knives was unearthed in the Jiaqing period (1796–1820) in Boshan in eastern Shandong. Later finds have been made in the same area. This area was part of the state of Qi; and their legends also refer to Qi. Between 284 and 279 BC, the State of Yan occupied most of the territory of Qi, and it is generally accepted that these coins come from this time. Otherwise, their reverse inscriptions, which appear to refer to place names, have not been satisfactorily deciphered. One reading gives the first character as Ju (莒; jǔ) for Ju city.
- Straight knives (直刀): These are smaller knives, and their blades are not curved or only slightly curved. They were issued by a few places in the state of Zhao. This category includes some other smaller knives of various shapes. They are found in hoards with Ming knives.

== Qi knives ==
Qi knives can be categorised based on the number of Chinese characters are present on the obverse side of the knife. The Qi knife money evolved from an ancient Chinese bronze implement with a ring at the end, this ancient knife was known as a xue (削). While knife money is shaped like a knife, the Qi knives were never actually used as actual knives.

This categorisation further subdivides these knives into Three Character Knives (三字刀), Four Character Knives (四字刀), Five Character Knives (五字刀), and Six Character Knives (六字刀). It is believed that of all these categories the Four Character Knives are the oldest and that they were introduced sometime early during the Spring and Autumn period. The Five Character Knives began to be produced in the late Spring and Autumn period. The Three Character Knives are found to have begun circulating during the early to middle Warring States period.

While the earliest form of knife money circulated in the State of Qi, knife money would later spread to the States of Yan and Zhao.

All types of Qi knife money are considered to be rare in the modern era.

=== Three Character Knives ===
Some Three Character Knives (三字刀) bear the inscription "Qi fa hua" (齊法化, "Qi Legal Money").

=== Five Character Knives ===
- Qi knives with five character inscriptions produced in the city of Jimo (present-day Pingdu, Shandong had the inscription "Ji mo zhi fa hua" (即墨之法化, "Jimo Legal Money").
- Qi knives with five character inscriptions produced in the city of Anyang (situated just east of what is now Caoxian, Shandong) had the inscription "An yang zhi fa hua" (安陽之法化, "Anyang Legal Money").

=== Six Character Knives ===
The Six Character Knives from the State of Qi were issued as a type of "commemorative coin" (simplified Chinese: 开国纪念币; traditional Chinese: 開國紀念幣; pinyin: kāi guó jì niàn bì). Six Character Knives tend to be quite large and thick, they were usually finely cast and made from quality bronze, and their inscriptions tend to display exquisite Chinese calligraphy. Six Character Knives are typically between 18.2 and 18.5 centimeters in length, between 2.8 and 2.9 centimeters in width, and their weight tends to be 45.5 and 50.9 grams.

One of the earlier commemorative issues of the Six Character Knives is to commemorate when Duke Tai of Tian Qi was formally recognised as the ruler of the State of Qi in the year 386 BC. This is the first known commemorative coin in the history of China and its inscription is written in an ancient Chinese script which today has become difficult to decipher.

The inscription is believed to be "qi zao bang chang fa huo" (simplified Chinese: 齐造邦长法化; traditional Chinese: 齊造邦長法化; pinyin: qí zào bāng cháng fǎ huà) which translates into English as "Qi, establish state long, legal money". However, other than this reading there are alternative interpretations of the inscription of this Six Character Knife. There are some experts who believe that the inscription doesn't read "齊造邦長法化", but rather "齊複邦長法化" or "齊返邦長法化". In this context, this inscription refers to a "return" instead of an "establishment".

This alternative reading may be a reference to an event where Duke Tai of Tian Qi defeated the Yan military at Jimo in the year 284 BC, which allowed the return King Xiang of Qi from the State of Ju back to Linzi, the Qi capital, in the year 279 BC.

While the obverse side of Six Character Knives feature six Chinese characters, the reverse side usually only contains one character. It is believed that this character may refer to the knife's denomination or served as a type of mint mark, alternatively as these knives were cast in stone moulds, it is believed that other characters on the reverse side may indicate in which mould the knife was cast. The character "十" (ten) is generally believed to be a denomination, while the characters "司" (Si), "工" (Gong), and "日" (Ri) are believed to represent the names of newly established mints in the city of Linzi, where all the Six Character Knives were cast. The rarest Chinese characters found on the reverse sides of Six Character Knives are "化" (Hua) and "上" (Shang).

=== Purchasing power of Qi knives ===
Professor Song Jie (宋杰; 宋傑; sòng jié) wrote in an academic paper entitled "A History of China’s Ancient Money" (中国古代货币史; 中國古代貨幣史; zhōng guó gǔ dài huò bì shǐ) about the contemporary purchasing power of a Qi knife. During the late Warring States period, one dou (斗) of rice, equivalent to about 10 litres, could be purchased with 3 Ban Liang cash coins. According to Professor Song Jie, a Qi knife would have been the equivalent of 7 or 8 Ban Liang cash coins. Therefore, one Qi knife would have been able to buy more than 2 dou or 23 to 26 litres of rice.

=== Qi knives in the Qi Heritage Museum ===
The largest collection of Qi knife money in the world is located at the Qi Heritage Museum (齐文化博物院) in Linzi, Shandong. This museum is located at the site of what once was the capital city of the State of Qin. All the artifacts in the collection of the Qi Heritage Museum have been obtained through archaeological excavations.

== Commemorative knife money ==
The Six Character Knives (六字刀) issued by the State of Qi were the first Chinese form of money to commemorate the founding of a new ruling family or dynasty (開國紀念幣). Because they were sometimes cast to commemorate a special event and because of their status as a monetary object, they are considered to be one of China's earliest commemorative coinages.

Because Six Character Knives are the rarest of all the different types of Qi knives and also among the rarest of all ancient Chinese coinages, they tend to sell for very high prices at auctions. In the year May 2014, a Six Character Knife was sold at an auction conducted by the Xiling Yinshe Auction Co. (西泠印社拍卖有限公司) in the city of Hangzhou for the equivalent of US$140,239 (or 862,500 yuan).

== Xin dynasty knife money ==
Wang Mang was a nephew of the Dowager Empress Wang. In AD 9, he usurped the throne, and founded the Xin dynasty. He introduced a number of currency reforms which met with varying degrees of success.

Many of the newly introduced currencies under Wang Mang had denominations that did not reflect the intrinsic value of the currency. As an example, a monetary piece may have had a nominal value of 1000 Wu Zhu cash coins had only an intrinsic value of three or four Wu Zhu cash coins. In his attempt to restore the ancient institutions of the Zhou dynasty, Wang Mang had issued many different types of money in very many forms.

Because of the unrealistically high nominal value of the money issued under Wang Mang, many Chinese people had turned to casting their own coinages as a response, in order to minimise their losses. As a countermeasure, however, Wang Mang issued edicts that stipulated very strict punishments for those who were caught privately casting coins during his reign.

The first reform, in AD 7, retained the Wu Zhu series of cash coins, but reintroduced two versions of the knife money:

Wang Mang era knife money
Description	Image
Yi Dao Ping Wu Qian (Chinese: 一刀平五千; pinyin: yīdāo píng wǔqiān; lit. 'One Knife Worth Five Thousand') on which the Yi Dao characters are inlaid in gold.	
Qi Dao Wu Bai (Chinese: 契刀五百; pinyin: qì dāo wǔbǎi; lit. 'Inscribed Knife Five Hundred')	

Unlike the Yi Dao Ping Wu Qian knives, the inscription of the Qi Dao Wu Bao knives aren’t inlaid with gold. The nominal value of the Qi Dao Wu Bao knives was 500 Wu Zhu cash coins.

== Korean knife money ==
The history of Korean currency dates back to around the 3rd century BC, when the first coins, in the form of knife coins, also known as "Myeongdojun" in Korean, belonging to the state of Yan and Gojoseon, were said to have been circulated.

== Hoards of knife money ==
- In 1960 it was reported by the Toledo Blade that a number of knife coins dating to the Warring States period were unearthed in Luanping County, Hebei province. Among the hoard were also a number of other items including kitchen utensils, bricks, tiles, bronze mirrors, agate beads coln, and copper coins.
- In the year 2012 a Chinese villager in the province of Hebei digging a well in his yard had unearthed a large cache of knife and spade money which was dated to the Warring States period. The hoard included 98 specimens of knife money and 161 specimens of spade money. This was the first major hoard of ancient Chinese coinage from this era that had been unearthed in Laiyuan County, Hebei. Both the spade and knife money from this hoard were attributed to Yan. The hoard includes both "square foot" spades (方足布) and "pointed foot" spades (尖足布).
- It was reported on May 3, 2013, that Mr. Liu Jiafu (刘佳富), a villager from Pingquan, Hebei, had discovered a buried clay pot containing about 600 specimen knife money in Guangxingdian Village (广兴店村). According to Mr. Chang Wen (常文) from the Cultural Relics Protection Bureau of Pingquan County (平泉县问保所) all of the knife money found were "Ming knives" issued by Yan.

== See also ==
- History of Chinese currency
- Ancient Chinese coinage
- Chinese coinage in the Ming dynasty
- Renminbi
- Axe-monies
- Bullet money
- Spade money
