= Tieqian =

Ancient coins of China, Japan and Vietnam

Iron cash coins
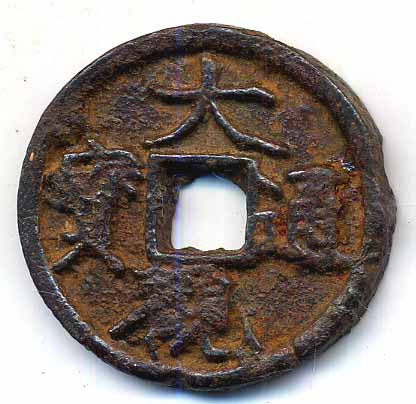
- An iron Daguan Tongbao (大觀通寶, 1107–1110) cash coin produced during the reign of Emperor Huizong in the Song dynasty period.

Chinese name
- Traditional Chinese: 鐡錢
- Simplified Chinese: 铁钱
Transcriptions
Standard Mandarin
- Hanyu Pinyin: tiě qián

Vietnamese name
- Vietnamese alphabet: Thiết tiền
- Chữ Hán: 鐡錢

Japanese name
- Kana: てっせん
- Kyūjitai: 鐡錢
- Shinjitai: 鉄銭
Transcriptions
- Romanization: Tessen

Iron cash coins (traditional Chinese: 鐡錢; simplified Chinese: 铁钱; pinyin: tiě qián; Vietnamese: Thiết tiền; (Note: Vernacular Vietnamese: Tiền sắt.) Japanese: 鉄銭（てっせん）; Rōmaji: Tessen) are a type of Chinese cash coin that were produced at various times during the monetary history of imperial China as well as in Japan and Vietnam. Iron cash coins were often produced in regions where the supply of copper was insufficient, or as a method of paying for high military expenditures at times of war, as well as for exports at times of trade deficits.

While the earlier recorded iron cash coins in Chinese history were Wu Zhu's (五銖, 118 BC–618 AD), the unearthing or iron Ban Liang (半兩) cash coins produced during the Western Han dynasty during the 1950s indicates that they may have been much older than first thought. The largest number of iron cash coins would be produced during the Song dynasty period as a result of a scarcity of copper and high military expenditures, among other reasons. The last government attempt at issuing iron cash coins occurred during the 1850s the under the reign of the Manchu Qing dynasty.

Iron cash coins were not exclusively produced by the Chinese, as other cash coin producing countries would also issue them under similar circumstances or by private mints. In Japan iron Kan'ei Tsūhō (寛永通寳) cash coins were produced by the Kamedo mint in the 1760s.

== Overview ==
Over the course of Chinese history a number of monarchs had tried to introduce iron cash coins to the market, but as their subjects never took to them, most of these attempts to issue them were rather short-lived. Sometimes bronze coins that were cast had a certain amount of iron in them, but in these cases the iron was not mixed into the copper-alloy itself, as it was just not removed during the production process, for example with some Warring States period round hole coins with the inscription "Yuan" (垣) which was made of about 30% iron. The mechanical strength of the cast coinages was thus reduced, but in the case of coins this was not as important as with tools as they did not serve any practical means other than their commodity value.

Iron cash coins were produced during the Han dynasty, Three Kingdoms period, Northern and Southern dynasties period, Five dynasties and Ten kingdoms period, Song dynasty, Jin dynasty (1115–1234), Western Xia dynasty, Ming dynasty, and Qing dynasty, but not during the Zhou dynasty, Jin dynasty (266–420), Sui dynasty, Tang dynasty, Liao dynasty, and Yuan dynasty periods.

== Ban Liang cash coins ==
=== Western Han dynasty ===
It is possible that China first began using iron cash coins during the Western Han dynasty, this was concluded after a number of iron Ban Liang (半兩) cash coins were unearthed in Western Han era tombs in the Hunanese cities of Hengyang and Changsha between the years 1955 and 1959. Other specimens of iron Ban Liang cash coins were also unearthed in the province of Sichuan.

== Wu Zhu cash coins ==
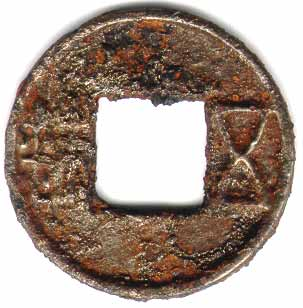
An iron Wu Zhu (五銖) cash coin attributed to Gongsun Shu's Chengjia state.

=== Chengjia ===
The Iron Wu Zhu's of Chengjia, which resemble the Western Han dynasty Wu Zhu coin, is attributed to Gongsun Shu, who rebelled in Sichuan in AD 25, and issued iron coins, two being equal to one Jian Wu Wu Zhu (Chinese: 建武五銖; pinyin: jiàn wǔ wǔ zhū). Head of the zhu component rounded. Typical of Eastern Han Wu Zhu's. In AD 30, a ditty was sung by the youths of Sichuan: "The yellow bull! the white belly! Let Wu Zhu cash coins return". This ridiculed the tokens of Wang Mang and the iron coins of Gongsun Shu, which were withdrawn by the Eastern Han Emperor Guangwu in the 16th year of Jian Wu (AD 40). The Emperor was advised that the foundation of the wealth of a country depends on a good political economy, which was found in the good old Wu Zhu coinage, and so reissued the Wu Zhu cash coins.

=== Liang dynasty ===
From the year 523 onwards the government of the Liang dynasty decided to cast iron Wu Zhu cash coins due to the fact that iron was both relatively easy and not expensive to acquire in what is today Sichuan. The iron cash coins issued by the Liang dynasty are quite distinctive from other iron cash coins as they have four lines that radiate outwards from each corner of the square center hole which is why they are referred to as "four corner coins" (四出錢, sì chū qián). As it became quite common for the people to cast iron cash coins privately based on these government issues it was not long before their quantities increased so drastically that it required cartloads of these iron Wu Zhu cash coins to pay for anything, even to this day these Wu Zhu's are quite common due to the widespread private production that plagued these iron issues. After them the Taiqing Fengle (太清豐樂, "Tai Qing Prosperous and Happy") cash coin was cast under the reign of Emperor Wu, these cash coins were actually believed to be Chinese numismatic charms until recently and were named after the Taiqing period (547-549).

== The Five Dynasties and Ten Kingdoms ==
=== Kingdom of Min ===
Issued by Wang Shenzhi:

- Kaiyuan Tongbao (Chinese: 開元通寶; pinyin: kāiyuán tōng bǎo) have a large dot above on the reverse side. They are made of iron and date from 922. The same coin cast in bronze is extremely rare.

Issued by Wang Yanxi:

- Yonglong Tongbao (Chinese: 永隆通寶; pinyin: yǒnglóng tōng bǎo) have the character Min (Chinese: 閩; pinyin: mǐn) on the reverse and comes from the Fujian region. There is a crescent below. It is made of iron and dates from 942. One of these large Yong Long coins was worth 10 small coins and 100 lead coins. A string of 500 of these poorly made Min iron coins were popularly called a kao (lit. 'a manacle').

Issued by Wang Yanzheng:

- Tiande Tongbao (Chinese: 天德通寶; pinyin: tiān dé tōng bǎo) are made of iron. When Wang Yanzheng was proclaimed Emperor, he changed the name of the kingdom to Yin, but later restored the name of Min. One of these iron coins, which were cast in 944, was worth 100 ordinary cash.

=== Kingdom of Chu ===
Supreme Commander Ma Yin:

- Tiance Fubao (Chinese: 天策府寶; pinyin: tiān cè fǔ bǎo) are made of iron. Ma Yin, originally a carpenter, was given the rank of Supreme Commander of Tiance, Hunan, by Emperor Zhu Wen of the Later Liang, and minted this coin in 911 to commemorate the event. Ma Yin later became King Wumu of Chu.
- Qianfeng Quanbao (Chinese: 乾封泉寶; pinyin: qiān fēng quán bǎo) are made of iron. According to the histories, because there was much lead and iron in Hunan, Ma Yin took the advice of his minister Gao Yu to cast lead and iron coins at Changsha in 925. One of these was worth ten copper cash, and their circulation was confined to Changsha. Merchants traded in these coins, to the benefit of the State. In 2000, a hoard of over 3,000 of these coins was found near Changsha. Extremely rare bronze specimens are also known.

=== Later Shu ===
- Guangzheng Tongbao (Chinese: 廣政通寶; pinyin: guǎng zhèngtōng bǎo) are made of bronze and iron. The bronze coins were cast by Meng Chang from the beginning of this period, 938. In 956, iron coins began to be cast to cover additional military expenses. They circulated until 963.

=== Southern Tang Kingdom ===
Emperor Yuan Zong (Li Jing) (943–961):

- Baoda Yuanbao (Chinese: 保大元寶; pinyin: bǎo dà yuán bǎo) has on the reverse the character tian above. They are made of iron and date between 943 and 957. There is also an extremely rare bronze example of this coin.

=== You Zhou Autonomous Region coinage ===
The You Zhou Autonomous Region (割據幽州) was proclaimed by the warlord Liu Rengong and later his son Liu Shouguang, who overthrew him. The Youzhou region is in what is today known as Beijing and surrounding areas in the Hebei Province. The geography of the region allowed it to maintain a level of autonomy during the Five Dynasties and Ten Kingdoms period similar to the southern kingdoms. The region became autonomous in 822, but it wasn't until 900 that the Liu regime started.

The Liu warlords instituted a brutal regime, confiscating the circulating bronze cash coins and then buried them in a cave in Mount Da’an (in modern Beijing), which was under their control. After the coins were hidden away Liu Rengong ordered all the workmen to be executed and then sealed off the cave.

Consequently, in the absence of bronze cash coins the population became reliant cash coins made of clay for payments. Besides the clay cash coins, the You Zhou Autonomous Region's government also issued a variety of poorly-made large denomination iron cash coins. Among the coinages issued by the regime was also an iron spade coin with the inscription Huobu Sanbai (貨布三百, "spade money three hundred"), which resembles the Xin dynasty period Spade coins. Among the iron cash coins cast by the You Zhou Autonomous Region were also those that resembled the Wu Zhu cash coins of the Sui dynasty (隋五銖). Furthermore, the autonomous government also issued other poorly made iron cash coins which were imitations of cash coins of previous regimes and are attributed to the You Zhou, these iron cash coins with the inscription Shuntian Yuanbao (順天元寶) have a number of different characters on their reverse sides, including bǎi (百, "hundred") and qiān (千, "thousand").

The Yong'an (永安) title which appears on both bronze and iron cash coins from this period takes its inscription from a Xia dynasty period title, but they were likely cast due to unregulated private minting. Modern attribution of these cash coins is mostly based on archaeology.

Liu Shouguang proclaimed himself to be the Emperor of Great Yan (大燕皇帝, Dà yàn huángdì) adopting the era title of Yìng tiān (應天) in 911, issuing a number of new iron cash coins. However, while these iron cash coins are typically attributed to this regime, this attribution is not generally accepted. The calligraphy found on these cash coins resembles the calligraphy found on cash coins by the Later Liang with the inscriptions Kaiping Tongbao (開平通寶) and Kaiping Yuanbao (開平元寶). Furthermore, of each these of these cash coins a single genuine specimen is generally believed to exist, all of which are in the private collections of Japanese citizens, meaning that they are currently not available for further research to affirm this attribution.

==== List of coins issued by the You Zhou Autonomous Region ====
Inscription	Traditional Chinese	Simplified Chinese	Hanyu Pinyin	Translation	Composition	Notes and differentiating features	Catalogue numbers	Obverse image	Reverse image
Yong An Yi Shi	永安一十	永安一十	yǒng'ān yīshí	Perpetual Peace One Ten	Bronze	Inscription read left, right, top, bottom (LRTB).	Hartill #15.160, FD #832		
Yong An Yi Shi	永安一十	永安一十	yǒng'ān yīshí	Perpetual Peace One Ten	Iron	Inscription read left, right, top, bottom (LRTB).	Hartill #15.161, FD #833		
Yong An Yi Bai	永安一百	永安一百	yǒng'ān yībǎi	Perpetual Peace One Hundred	Bronze	Inscription read right, left, top, bottom (RLTB).	Hartill #15.162, FD #834		
Yong An Yi Bai	永安一百	永安一百	yǒng'ān yībǎi	Perpetual Peace One Hundred	Iron	Inscription read right, left, top, bottom (RLTB).	Hartill #15.163, FD #835		
Yong An Wu Bai	永安五百	永安五百	yǒng'ān wǔbǎi	Perpetual Peace Five Hundred	Bronze	Inscription read right, left, top, bottom (RLTB).	Hartill #15.164, FD #836		
Yong An Wu Bai	永安五百	永安五百	yǒng'ān wǔbǎi	Perpetual Peace Five Hundred	Iron	Inscription read right, left, top, bottom (RLTB).	Hartill #15.165, FD #837		
Yong An Yi Qian	永安一千	永安一千	yǒng'ān yīqiān	Perpetual Peace One Thousand	Bronze	Small. Inscription read right, left, top, bottom (RLTB).	Hartill #15.166, FD #838		
Yong An Yi Qian	永安一千	永安一千	yǒng'ān yīqiān	Perpetual Peace One Thousand	Iron	Small. Inscription read right, left, top, bottom (RLTB).	Hartill #15.167, FD #840		
Yong An Yi Qian	永安一千	永安一千	yǒng'ān yīqiān	Perpetual Peace One Thousand	Iron	Large. Inscription read right, left, top, bottom (RLTB).	Hartill #15.168, FD #841		
Wu Zhu	五銖	五铢	wǔ zhū	Five Zhu	Iron	Iron cash coins resembling the bronze Wu Zhu cash coins of the Sui Dynasty ("Sui wu zhu", 隋五銖 / 隋五铢).	Hartill #15.169		
Huo Bu (obverse); San Bai (reverse)	貨布 (Obverse) 三百 (reverse)	货布 (Obverse) 三百 (reverse)	huò bù (obverse) sānbǎi (reverse)	Money Spade (obverse); Three Hundred (reverse)	Iron	An iron coin resembling the ancient Chinese spade money of Emperor Wang Mang of the Xin dynasty.	Hartill #15.170		
Shuntian Yuanbao	順天元寶	顺天元宝	shùn tiān yuánbǎo	In accord with the ways of heaven - inaugural treasure	Iron	Reverse: Crescent above, "Ten" (十) below.	Hartill #15.171		
Shuntian Yuanbao	順天元寶	顺天元宝	shùn tiān yuánbǎo	In accord with the ways of heaven - inaugural treasure	Iron	Reverse: Crescent above, "Hundred" (百) below.	Hartill #15.172		
Shuntian Yuanbao	順天元寶	顺天元宝	shùn tiān yuánbǎo	In accord with the ways of heaven - inaugural treasure	Iron	Reverse: Large dot above.	Hartill #15.173		
Shuntian Yuanbao	順天元寶	顺天元宝	shùn tiān yuánbǎo	In accord with the ways of heaven - inaugural treasure	Iron	Reverse: Crescent above, "Thousand" (千) below.	Hartill #15.174		
Sometimes attributed to Liu Shouguang, as Emperor of Great Yan (911-914) (Note: The calligraphy found on these 3 bronze cash coins is similar, therefore these cash coins are believed to have been cast during the period when Liu Shouguang declared himself the Emperor of Great Yan.)
Yingtian Yuanbao - Qian (Note: The Chinese character "Qian" (千) means "thousand".)	應天元寶 - 千	应天元宝 - 千	Yìng tiān yuánbǎo - qiān		Bronze				
Qiansheng Yuanbao - Bai (Note: The Chinese character "Bai" (百) means "hundred".)	乾聖元寶 - 百	乾圣元宝 - 百	Qián shèng yuánbǎo - bǎi		Bronze				
Yingsheng Yuanbao - Shi (Note: The Chinese character "Shi" (拾) means "ten".)	應聖元寶 - 拾	应圣元宝 - 拾	Yīngshèng yuánbǎo - shí		Bronze				

==== Research and archaeology related to the You Zhou Autonomous Region coinage ====
While both bronze and (mostly) iron cash coins with the Yong'an inscription were found both in and around Beijing with mentions of people finding these cash coins during the Jurchen-led Jin dynasty to the Manchu-led Qing dynasty periods, it wasn't until the 1920s when large number of Yong'an cash coins were unearthed in Da'an Village, Fangshan District, Beijing that more was known about them. The famous Chinese numismatist Fang Ruo (方若) started researching the subject did he attribute the Yong'an cash coins to the You Zhou Autonomous Region, as there was no clear record of their attribution in the history books.

== Song dynasty ==
=== Northern Song dynasty ===
After the Song dynasty was done with "pacifying" Sichuan, the Emperor of the Song dynasty had the bronze cash coins that were circulating in the area sent back to the Song Chinese capital city. The bronze cash coins were then replaced with those cast of iron, this then caused the price of goods to soar in the region resulting in great hardship to the local populace.

In the year 978 an iron cash coin was worth 1/10 of a copper-alloy cash coin.

From the beginning of the dynasty, iron coins were extensively used in present-day Sichuan and Shaanxi where copper was not readily available. Between 976 and 984, a total of 100,000 strings of iron coins was produced in Fujian as well. In 993, for paying the land tax one iron coin was equal to one bronze, for the salary of clerks and soldiers one bronze equalled five iron coins, but in trade ten iron coins were needed for one bronze coin. In 1005, four mints in Sichuan produced over 500,000 strings of iron coins a year. This declined to 210,000 strings by the beginning of the Qingli period (1041). At this time, the mints were ordered to cast 3 million strings of iron cash to meet military expenses in Shaanxi. However, by 1056, casting was down to 100,000 strings a year, and in 1059 minting was halted for 10 years in Jiazhou and Qiongzhou, leaving only Xingzhou producing 30,000 strings a year.

"In the 2nd year of Ching-te (AD 1005) large iron coins were cast in the two localities of Chia-ting Fu and Chiung-chou [Jiongzhou] in Szechuan [Sichuan], value one copper cash or ten small iron cash. These all circulated jointly and gave much satisfaction."

- Chinese Currency, Currency of the Far East A Comprehensive Text Chou Dynasty, 1122 B.C 255 B.C. Through Ch'ing Dynasty 1644 A.D 1911 A.D by Fredrik Schjöth and Virgil Hancock. Page 28.

During the Xining period (from 1068), minting was increased, and by the Yuanfeng period (from 1078) it was reported that there were nine iron coin mints, three in Sichuan and six in Shaanxi, producing over a million strings a year. Thereafter, output declined gradually.

Although the output of copper currency had expanded immensely by 1085, some fifty copper mines were shut down between the years 1078 and 1085. Although there were on average more copper mines found in Northern Song China than in the previous Tang dynasty, this case was reversed during the Southern Song with a sharp decline and depletion of mined copper deposits by 1165. Even though copper cash was abundant in the late 11th century, Chancellor Wang Anshi's tax substitution for corvée labor and government takeover of agricultural finance loans meant that people now had to find additional cash, driving up the price of copper money which would become scarce. To make matters worse, large amounts of government-issued copper currency exited the country via international trade, while the Liao dynasty and Western Xia actively pursued the exchange of their iron-minted coins for Song copper coins. As evidenced by an 1103 decree, the Song government became cautious about its outflow of iron currency into the Liao Empire when it ordered that the iron was to be alloyed with tin in the smelting process, thus depriving the Liao of a chance to melt down the currency to make iron weapons.

The government attempted to prohibit the use of copper currency in border regions and in seaports, but the Song-issued copper coin became common in the Liao, Western Xia, Japanese, and Southeast Asian economies. The Song government would turn to other types of material for its currency in order to ease the demand on the government mint, including the issuing of iron coinage and paper banknotes. In the year 976, the percentage of issued currency using copper coinage was 65%; after 1135, this had dropped significantly to 54%, a government attempt to debase the copper currency.

As a result of government corruption, a large number of iron cash coins were cast near the final years of Emperor Zhezong's reign.

Merchant guilds in the province of Sichuan were worldwide the first people to develop officially accepted letters of exchange, or paper money, in the forms of Jiaozi (交子), Qianyin (錢引), and Feiqian (飛錢), thess first forms of paper currency were provided with the security of iron cash coins.

==== Emperor Taizu (960–976) ====
- Songyuan Tongbao. (Chinese: 宋元通寶; pinyin: sòng yuán tōng bǎo). Written in li script. The inscription is based on the Kaiyuan Tongbao series of cash coins. It has a nominal weight of 1 qian. Various dots and crescents are found on the reverse. It was first cast in 960 and then until the end of Emperor Taizu's reign. Casting of iron cash coins started at Baizhangxian, Yazhou, in Sichuan, from 970. Ten furnaces cast 9,000 strings a year.

==== Emperor Taizong (976–997) ====
- Taiping Tongbao (Chinese: 太平通寶; pinyin: tài píng tōng bǎo) (976–989). Written in li script. Various dots and crescents are found on the reverse. There are also iron cash coins with this inscription. The small iron coins come from Sichuan and 10 were equivalent to one bronze coin. The large iron cash coin have a large dot above on the reverse. This coin was cast at Jianzhou, Fujian in 983, and was intended to be equivalent to 3 bronze coins.
- Chunhua Yuanbao (Chinese: 淳化元寶; pinyin: chún huà yuánbǎo) (990–994). Written in regular, running, and grass script. There are also small and large iron coins. They have a nominal value of 10. In 991, 20,000 iron coins were needed in the market for one roll of silk. Permission was requested to alter the casting to Value Ten coins in the Imperial Script pattern. In one year only 3,000 strings were cast. They were not considered convenient, so casting was stopped.

==== Emperor Zhenzong (998–1022) ====
- Xianping Yuanbao (Chinese: 咸平元寶; pinyin: xián píng yuánbǎo) (998–1003). Written in regular script. They are found in both bronze and iron.
- Jingde Yuanbao (Chinese: 景德元寶; pinyin: jǐng dé yuánbǎo) (1004–1007). Written in regular script. They are made of bronze; Iron with Value Two; or Iron with Value Ten. The large iron cash coins were minted at Jiazhou and Qiongzhou in Sichuan in the year 1005. They weighed 4 qian each.
- Xiangfu Yuanbao (Chinese: 祥符元寶; pinyin: xiáng fú yuánbǎo) (1008–1016). Written in regular script. They are made of bronze or iron. They come in medium size and large sizes. The large iron coins were cast from 1014 to 1016 in Yizhou, Sichuan. Their nominal value was 10 cash and weight 3.2 qian.
- Tianxi Tongbao (Chinese: 天禧通寶; pinyin: tiān xǐ tōng bǎo) (1017–1022). Written in regular script. They are made of bronze or iron. At this time, there were copper coin mints at Yongping in Jiangxi, Yongfeng in Anhui, Kuangning in Fujian, Fengguo in Shanxi, and in the capital city. There were also three iron coin mints in Sichuan.

==== Emperor Renzong (1022–1063) ====
- Mingdao Yuanbao (Chinese: 明道元寶; pinyin: míngdào yuánbǎo) (1032–1033). Written in seal and regular script. There are also iron cash coins with this inscription.
- Jingyou Yuanbao (Chinese: 景祐元寶; pinyin: jǐng yòu yuánbǎo) (1034–1038). Written in seal and regular script. There are both small and large iron coins.
- Huangsong Tongbao (Chinese: 皇宋通寶; pinyin: huáng sòng tōng bǎo) (1039–1054) use seal and regular script, and have many variations. They are made of iron and have two forms with either small or large characters. The small character iron coins are associated with casting in Shaanxi and Shanxi in the Qing Li period (from 1044). The large character iron cash coins are associated with Sichuan mints. The histories say that the Huang Song coin was cast in Baoyuan 2 – 1039. As it is rather common, and there are no bronze small cash from the next three periods, it appears to have been issued for longer than one year.
- Kangding Yuanbao (Chinese: 康定元寶; pinyin: kāngdìng yuánbǎo) (1040). Written in li script. They are made of iron and come in both small and medium sizes.
- Qingli Zhongbao (Chinese: 慶歷重寶; pinyin: qìnglì zhòng bǎo) (1041–1048). Written in regular script. There are two forms: large bronze coins and large iron coins. The Qing Li large bronze coins, intended to be worth 10 cash, were cast in Jiangnan to fund the war with the Tangut Western Xia Empire. Iron coins were cast in Shanxi and other prefectures. The large cash coins caused prices to leap up, causing inflation, and both public and private interests suffered. In 1048, the large iron coins were devalued to 3 iron cash.

=== Southern Song dynasty ===
The Southern Song dynasty saw the emergence of paper money, while coins were increasingly becoming a rarity. Iron cash coins also started to be used in greater numbers, at first due to the lack of copper, but later even as more copper was found the production of iron cash coins remained cheaper and an abundance of iron made it more attractive for the government to produce, while several problems such as the fact that iron is harder to inscribe, and that iron corrodes faster ensured the continued production of copper cash coins. From the year 1180 until the end of the Song dynasty very few bronze coins were produced by the government as the preference went to iron, this was because bronze cash coins needed to have a specific typeface which was more intricate to produce.

== Qing dynasty ==
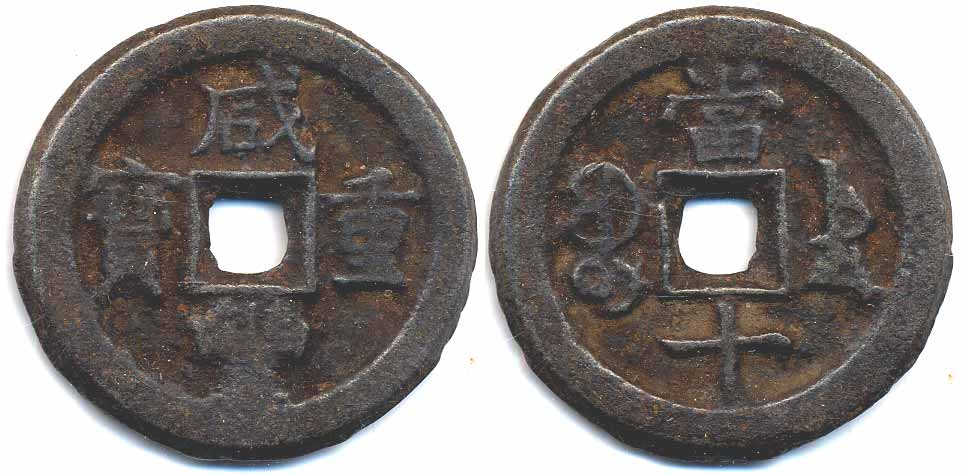
An iron Xianfeng Zhongbao (咸豐重寶) cash coin of 10 wén.

During the second month of the year 1854 the government of the Qing dynasty supplemented the already debased Xianfeng coinage system with iron cash coins. The intrinsic value of iron cash coins was substantially lower than that of even the copper-alloy Zhiqian and Daqian. The aim the government had with the introduction of iron cash coins was to provide small change for a market that highly demanded it, as the Chinese market was already flooded with large denomination cash coinage and the Zhiqian 1 wén cash (coins) by this point had become a rarity.

The denominations of the newly introduced iron cash coins included 1 wén, 5 wén, and 10 wén. The intrinsic value of the 1 wén iron cash coin represented a debasement of 70% compared to the copper-alloy 1 wén Zhiqian. The market price of iron in 1854 was 40 wén (in Zhiqian) per catty. A catty of iron could be cast into 133 1 wén iron cash coins, or 66 5 wén iron cash coins (which would have a total nominal value of 330 wén), or 53 10 wén iron cash coins (which would have a total nominal value of 530 wén). Disregarding the cost of manufacturing the Chinese itself, a 1 wén iron cash coin indicated a debasement of 70%. Iron cash coins were easily produced with iron scrap, which on the market cost 15 wén per catty in 1854.

While initially iron cash coins were mainly minted by the Ministry of Revenue mint and Ministry of Public Works mint in Beijing, afterwards the government of the Qing dynasty established a specific iron cash coins mint, known as the iron cash office (鐵錢局). The iron cash office also stored the iron cash coins. While the actual production numbers of iron cash coins remains unclear because of the limited entries about them in the records maintained by the Qing treasury, Peng Xinwei estimated, based on information he had gathered from Qing government memorials, that there had been an average annual production of 1,808,160 strings of iron cash coins between the year 1854 and 1855 and an annual production of 1,360,920 strings of iron cash coins during the years 1856 until 1859.

In January of the year 1855 the province of Zhili started casting iron cash coins, a trial casting for a single year was to deliver 120,000 strings of standard cash coins to be brought to Beijing. This work was then carried out by one of the Chinese branch mints with 10 furnaces that was located just outside of the western suburbs of Baoding by the Lingyu Temple (靈雲宮). In May of the year 1857, the four existing copper furnaces of the main Zhili provincial mint in Baoding were altered to be iron cash coin furnaces and a new iron cash coin furnace added, while at the same time 10 new furnaces for the production of iron cash coins was added to the Zhili branch mint. The Zhili provincial mint had ceased the production of 10 wén iron cash coins in June 1857.

Iron cash coin mints were also planned to be opened in the cities of Tianjin, Zhengding, and Daming for the production of 1 wén iron cash coins, but only Zhengding had established a mint for iron cash coins which had 10 furnaces in operation. In July of the year 1859 there were a total of 35 furnaces for the production of iron cash coins in the cities of Baoding and Zhengding and at that time around 1,000,000 strings of iron cash coins had been cast at both mints. Because the Chinese people weren't using iron cash coins it was reported that 30 furnaces in Zhengding (which presumably also includes the furnaces of the Zhili provincial branch mint) were to be closed. In November 1859, the remaining 5 iron cash coin furnaces situated in Baoding were also closed.

The function of iron cash coins was similar to that of Daqian, as it was primarily used as a way to continue paying the salaries of bannermen and other government workers. According to Qing government memorials, large amounts of iron cash coins were used as a means to pay salaries between the years 1856 and 1857 due to a noted justification that "the Chinese public was craving for small change". By the year 1856 the iron 10 wén cash coins were so much depreciated that they were dropped out of general circulation. From this point onwards only iron 1 wén cash coins would remain in general circulation, however, it was common for shops to deny them as a form of payment and there was extensive counterfeiting of iron cash coins, which further lowered the public's trust in them.

Only a single entry in the Qing government archive mentions them from this point, as it is stated that in the year 1856 the government of the Qing dynasty had 431,515.849 strings of iron cash coins deposited in the imperial treasury vault. This entry may be seen as supplementary evidence to suggest that copper-alloy cash coinage had almost completely disappeared in or before this year. Iron cash coins would soon become valueless and the coinage was ultimately suspended in the year 1859.

== Hoards of iron cash coins ==
List of hoards of iron cash coins
Hoard	Image
During the early 1970s a number of Yonglong Tongbao (永隆通寶) clay moulds (traditional Chinese: 錢陶範; simplified Chinese: 钱陶范; pinyin: Qián táo fàn) were uncovered at the Chengtian Temple in Quanzhou, Fujian. The clay moulds date to the Kingdom of Min during the Five Dynasties and Ten Kingdoms period and all display the inscription Yonglong Tongbao. The clay moulds were discovered by a group of Buddhist monks digging in the courtyard, in order to bury jars of a local Quanzhou-based traditional Chinese medicine known as "golden juice" (Chinese: 金汁; pinyin: jīn zhī), the elixir is made by mixing together the excrements of young (preadolescent) boys, spring water and "red soil" (traditional Chinese: 紅土; simplified Chinese: 红土; pinyin: hóng tǔ). After being prepared the solution is then stored inside a clay jar which is buried underground at a depth of approximately 3 meters. The clay jars are then left underground for a period of between 30 and 40 years, after which they are dug back up. "golden juice" as a form of "medicine" is taken orally and within traditional Chinese medicine it is considered to be particularly useful in the treatment of high fevers. While the initial clay moulds were uncovered during the early 1970s, it wasn't until the year 2002 when archeologists would formally excavate the site looking for more coin moulds. Yonglong Tongbao cash coins themselves today are very rare. There are only two specimens of them known to exist in Chinese museums and perhaps only about 100 specimens of Yonglong Tongbao cash coins are known to be in the hands of private Chinese coin collectors. Cash coins with this inscriptions were mostly made from iron, while an even smaller number of lead variants of them are known to exist. The reason as to why Yonglong Tongbao cash coins are so scarce has to do with the short period of time they were cast, which was only 1 year and 7 months. Furthermore, they are even rarer because of the facts that iron suffers from oxidation and deteriorates, the limited area in which the Yonglong Tongbao cash coins had circulated, and their intricate method of production.	
In July 1997 a large chunk of iron cash coins dating to the Song dynasty, described as a "mountain" of ancient Chinese cash coins, were unearthed in a field near the city of Cangzhou, Hebei. The discovered cash coins were made of iron and they tended to be stuck together in very large and often heavy pieces. The iron cash coins from the hoard are now displayed at the Tieqian Ku (铁钱库, "iron cash coins treasury") located in the city of Cangzhou.	
In a report by the People's Daily dated May 20, 2000 another hoard of iron cash coins was found in a field near Cangzhou, Hebei, at the same location as in 1997. The iron cash coins dated to the Northern Song dynasty period. The discovery was made by a local tourism department of Cangzhou city. The archeologists had initially dug up about 48 tonnes of iron cash coins, with the largest single chunk them weighing about 7 tonnes. The hoard was a breakthrough because never before were any iron cash coins discovered in northern China. Before this hoard, historians believed that iron cash coins were only used in regions where commerce flourished south of the Yangtze River. The archaeologists also found out that the Northern Song iron cash coins at the site had not simply rusted together but displayed clear signs that they had been melted together. Furthermore, at the site the archeologists also found some coin moulds and stoves that may suggest that a mint may have been located there in the past. However, some experts refuted this hypothesis because this area was part of a frontier region during the Song dynasty period and the Song government would in all likelihood not have built a coin mint in a remote border area like this. Contemporary experts noted that this coin hoard would re-write China's history of coin production. Why such a large quantity of Song dynasty period iron cash coins were buried in the area near Cangzhou and why these iron coins had apparently been melted together in such large chunks remains a mystery. According to Ms. Wang Yufang (王玉芳), the Director of the Cangzhou City Bureau of Cultural Relics (沧州市文物局), there are no historical documents dating to the Song dynasty that mention the existence of this iron cash coin cache. The most plausible hypothesis as to why these iron cash coins were located in such large quantities and why they were (partially) melted together claims that iron cash coins were sent to the area by the government of the Song dynasty in order to pay for military expenses contending for control of the Sixteen Prefectures against the Jurchens. The Song army was eventually defeated during this campaign. As they were forced to withdraw from the region, the Song army was faced with the prospect of having to transport such an enormous quantity of iron cash coins during their retreat. Since the transport of the iron cash coins would have been difficult to achieve, and given the fact that it was necessary them to make a hasty retreat, it is hypothesised that a decision was made by the Song army to abandon the huge amounts of money in the area, and that they were partially melted down to prevent the iron cash coinage from falling into the hands of the advancing enemy soldiers. The iron cash coins from the hoard are now displayed at the Tieqian Ku (铁钱库, "iron cash coins treasury") located in the city of Cangzhou.	
In April 2002 archeologists had begun a formal excavation at the Chengtian Temple in Quanzhou, Fujian, where three decades earlier a number of Kingdom of Min period Yonglong Tongbao (永隆通寶) clay moulds had been uncovered. At a depth of about 3 meters the archeologists had discovered over a thousand clay mould fragments at the location. While it known that the Min Kingdom had a mint, its exact location was unknown, but due to the discovery of such a large number of clay mould fragments discovered at the Chengtian Temple confirms that the mint was located somewhere in present-day Quanzhou, making it only known mint location from the Five Dynasties and Ten Kingdoms period at the time. The archaeologists considered this hoard to be particularly fortunate, as it is rare for such cultural objects made from clay to survive in climates that receive over 1200 millimeters of rain annually such as Quanzhou. This fact is cited to be one of the important reasons as to why no other sites which cast cash coins using clay moulds have been discovered in the modern period this far into southern China. Iron was used to cast cash coins by the Min Kingdom in the area because the region where Quanzhou is situated had ample supplies of iron and coal but lacked any copper reserves. As to why such a large quantity of clay moulds were discovered at the Chengtian Temple us because the casting method that was employed by the Min Kingdom at the time required a two-piece clay mould was made with a small hole in which the molten iron, with a temperature of at least 1535°C, could be poured into them. Once the iron had hardened, forming the cash coin, the clay mould had to be broken apart in order to take the cash coin out. Each clay mould could was only capable to produce a single cash coin. Furthermore, the archaeologists noted that while the casting technique for manufacturing cash coins had remained the same as it had in ancient times, the casting technology itself had evolved to the point where the Chinese character inscriptions displayed on the coinage could now be clearly cast.	
It was reported on 21 July 2006 by China News that a Northern Song dynasty period site filled with cultural relics had been discovered during the construction of a building in Xinzhen Village Dongying, Shandong. Experts from Dongying Cultural Relics Bureau excavated the site and found 3 tonnes of iron cash coins as well as some copper-alloy coins. Further, the hoard included pottery head portraits of minority ethnic people, chinaware, and parts of ancient architecture.	
It was reported on 30 October 2018 by CQCB (重庆日报客户端) that a coin hoard of around 3,000 Southern Song dynasty period cash coins had been discovered at a construction site along S434 in Tianba Village, Guanba town, Qijiang District, Chongqing. The cash coins were initially discovered on 26 October 2018 after a few construction workers had noticed the presence of round coins with square centre holes mong the rocks they were clearing. Liao Xiaobo, the On-Site Principal of Highway Maintenance Station of Chongqing Traffic, noted that these cash coins were found over 20 meters in the ground. Archaeologists managed to dig up around 3,000 cash coins at the site. At the time of the report all the unearthed cash coins were made from iron. The archaeologists suspect that the coins were produced during the Southern Song dynasty period but suspect that they may have been produced earlier. Linghu Keqiang, the head of the Museum of Chongqing Wansheng Economic and Technological Development Zone, stated that the find would aid with research on immigrant culture to the area and the local socio-economic development of Wansheng as it reflected the economic development level of the area at the time.	

== Iron cash coins museum ==
In the city of Cangzhou there is a museum dedicated to the iron cash coins produced during the Song dynasty period known as the Tieqian Ku (traditional Chinese: 鐡錢庫; simplified Chinese: 铁钱库; pinyin: tiě qián kù), which literally translates into English as either the "iron cash coins treasury" or "iron cash coins mint".

== Explanatory notes ==
=== Catalogue numbers ===
- Hartill = Cast Chinese Coins by David Hartill. Trafford, United Kingdom: Trafford Publishing. September 22, 2005. ISBN 978-1412054669.
- FD = Fisher's Ding (丁), George A. Fisher's copy of Ding Fubao's (丁福保) original work catalogue, 1980, 251 pages.
- Schjøth = "Chinese Currency, Currency of the Far East - A Comprehensive Text Chou Dynasty, 1122 B.C.–255 B.C. Through Ch'ing Dynasty 1644 A.D.–1911 A.D." by Fredrik Schjøth and Virgil Hancock, Oslow, Norway, 1929.
- Hartill-Qing = Qing Cash (清代貨幣) by David Hartill, Royal Numismatic Society (2003).
- Krause = C.L. Krause and C. Mishler, Standard Catalog of World Coins, Krause Publications, 1979.

== Sources ==
- Hartill, David (September 22, 2005). Cast Chinese Coins. Trafford, United Kingdom: Trafford Publishing. ISBN 978-1412054669.
- Hartill, David (2003). Qing cash. Special Publication. Vol. 37. London: Royal Numismatic Society.
- Peng Xinwei (彭信威) (1954 [2007]). Zhongguo huobi shi (中國貨幣史) (Shanghai: Qunlian chubanshe), 580–581, 597–605. (in Mandarin Chinese).
- Peng Xinwei (彭信威) (1994) A monetary history of China (translated by Edward H. Kaplan). Western Washington University (Bellingham, Washington).
