= Spade money =

Historical coinage of China

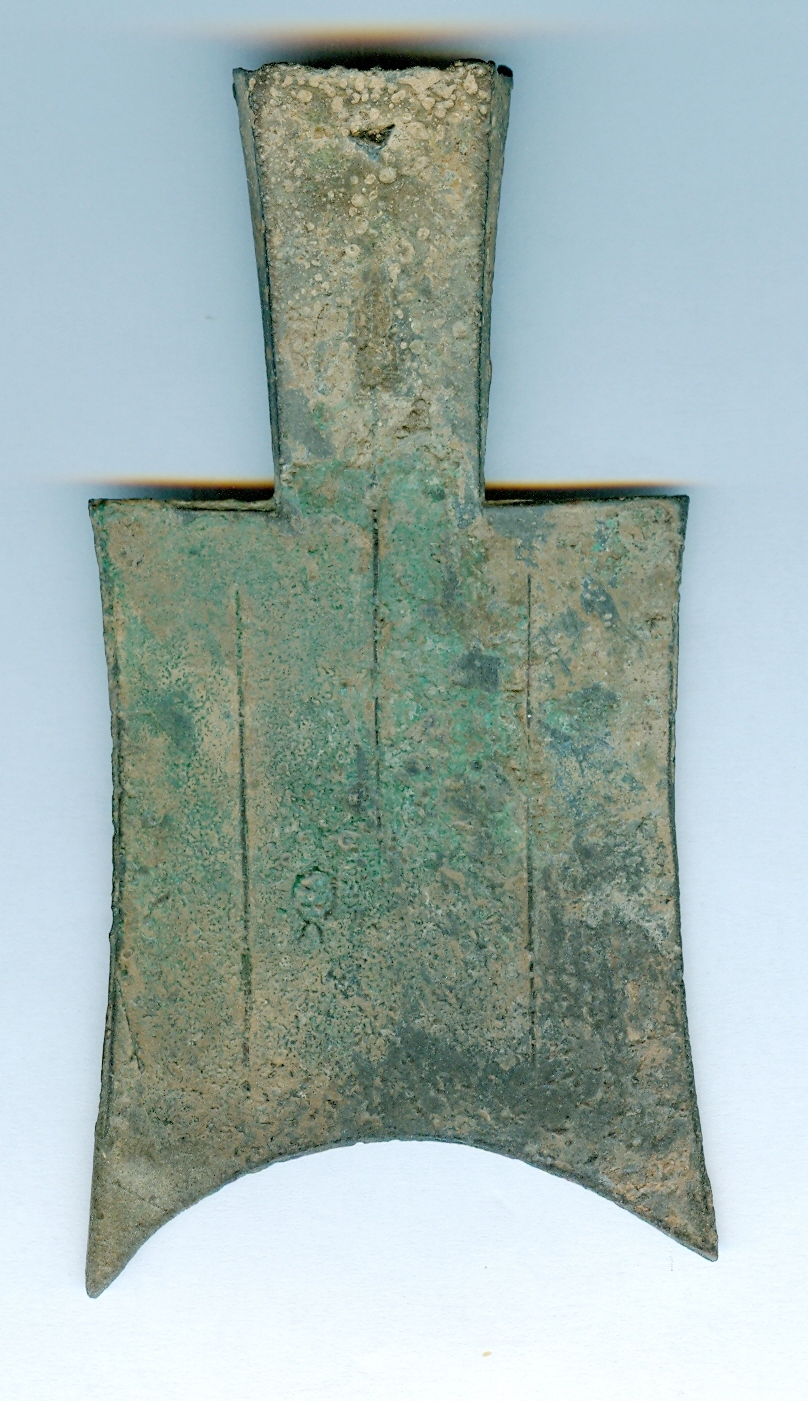
Square shoulder spade coin from the State of Zhou. c. 650–400 BC. One character bei (Chinese: 貝).

Spade money (traditional Chinese: 布幣; simplified Chinese: 布币; pinyin: bù bì) was an early form of coin and commodity money used during the Zhou dynasty of China (1045 to 256 BCE). Spade money was shaped like a spade or weeding tool, but the thin blade and small sizes of spade money indicate that it had no utilitarian function. The earlier versions of spade coins tended to have a fragile, hollow socket, reminiscent of a metal shovel. Later versions of spade money had this socket transformed into a thin, flat piece, and over time, inscriptions were added to the spade coins to mark their denominations. Several versions of spade money circulated across the Chinese Central Plains during the Zhou dynasty period until they were abolished by the Qin dynasty in 221 BC in favour of the Ban Liang cash coins.

Under the Xin dynasty created by Wang Mang spade money was reintroduced; there were 12 different types of spade money in the Xin dynasty, ranging in values from 100 to 1000 qián.

In 2021 a paper was published about an old mint that was discovered at an archeological site in Henan Province; through radiocarbon-dating the spade money found there was estimated to have been created between 640 BC and no later than 550 BC, making it possibly the world's oldest known mint, meaning that it is possible that the earliest known coinage was invented by the Chinese and not the Lydians as is commonly believed. Though the spade coins that were found at the Guanzhuang site are not as old as the metal coins that were discovered in the ancient city of Ephesus.

== Hollow-handled spade money ==
Hollow-handled spades (Chinese: 布幣; pinyin: bùbì) are a link between weeding tools used for barter and stylised objects used as money. Although flimsy, they retain the hollow socket where a handle would be attached for use as a genuine tool. This socket is rectangular in its cross-section and still retains the clay from the casting process. In the socket, the hole that fixes the tool to its handle is also reproduced.

- Prototype spade money: this type of spade money is similar in shape and size to the original agricultural implements. While some examples are robust enough to have been used in the fields, others are much lighter. Prototype spade money bears an inscription of the name of its issuing city. Some of these objects have been found in Shang and Western Zhou tombs, dating from 1200 to 800 BC. Inscribed specimens appear to date from c. 700 BC.
- Square shoulder spades: characteristics of this type of spade coin include square shoulders, a straight or slightly curving foot, and three parallel lines on the obverse and reverse. They have been found in quantities of up to several hundred in the area corresponding to the Royal Domain of Zhou (south Hebei and north Henan). Archaeological evidence dates them to the early spring and autumn period, approximately 650 BC and onward.

The inscriptions on these coins usually consist of one character, usually either a number, a cyclical character, a place name, or the name of a clan. The crude writing is that of the artisans who made the coins, not the more careful script of the scholars who wrote the votive inscriptions on bronze. The style of writing is consistent with that of the middle Zhou period. Over two hundred inscriptions are known, many of which have not been fully deciphered. The characters can be found on the left or right of the central line and may be inverted or retrograde. The alloy of these coins is typically 80% copper, 15% lead, and 5% tin. They are found in hoards of hundreds rather than thousands, sometimes tied together in bundles. Although there is no mention in the literature of their purchasing power, it is clear that they were not small change.

- Sloping shoulder spades: these spades usually have a sloping shoulder with the two outside lines on the obverse and reverse at an angle. The central line is often missing. This type is generally smaller than the prototype or square shoulder spades. Their inscriptions are clearer and usually consist of two characters. They are associated with the Kingdom of Zhou and the Henan area. Their smaller size indicates that they are later in date than square shoulder spades.
- Pointed shoulder spades: this type of spade has pointed shoulders and feet and a long hollow handle. There are three parallel lines on the obverse and reverse with occasional inscriptions. They are found in Northeast Henan and Shanxi, the territory of the Duchy of Jin, later to become Zhao. They are held to be somewhat later in date than the square shouldered spades. Their shape seems to be designed for ease of tying together in bundles, rather than deriving from any particular agricultural instrument.

== Flat-handled spade money ==
Flat-handled spade money does not have the hollow handle of the early spades. Nearly all have distinct legs, suggesting that their pattern was influenced by the pointed shoulder hollow-handled spades with further styling for easy handling. They are generally smaller and sometimes have denominations specified in their inscriptions in addition to place names. In combination with the little evidence of establishment dates of some mint towns, flat-handled spade money could have been a later development. Archaeological evidence dates them to the Warring States period (475 to 221 BC). Arched foot spades have an alloy consisting of about 80% copper; for other types the copper content varies between 40% and 70%.

- Arched foot spades: this type has an arched crutch like an inverted U. The shoulders can be rounded or angular. Denominations of half, one, or two jin are normally specified. Arched foot spaces are associated with the State of Liang (also known as Wei), which flourished between 425 and 344 BC, and the State of Han (403–230 BC).
- Special spades of Liang: special spades of Liang are similar in shape to the arched foot spades. Their inscriptions have been the subject of much debate. All now agreed that these coins were issued by the State of Liang, and the inscriptions indicate a relationship between the jin weight of the coins and the lie (another unit of weight or money).
- Pointed foot spades: this type has pointed feet and a square crutch. The shoulders can be pointing upwards or straight. They are a clear descendant of the pointed shoulder hollow-handled spade. The weight and size of the larger specimens is compatible with the one jin unit of the arched foot flat-handled spades. Smaller specimens can often specify the unit as a half jin or one jin (less frequent), but frequently do not specify a unit. This seems to imply that the half jin unit became the norm. They are associated with the State of Zhao and are usually found in Shanxi and Hebei provinces. They frequently have numerals on the reverse side. The two-character mint names mean that the cities that cast these coins can be identified with more certainty than those of earlier series.

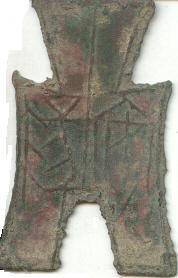
Square foot spade of An Yang

- Square foot spades: this type has square feet, a square crutch, and a central line on the obverse. The reverse normally has only three lines apart from on spades produced by some mints in the state of Zhao, who also produced pointed foot spades. These have numerals on the reverse. The mints that produced square foot spades are more numerous than those that produced the pointed foot spades. Their weights are compatible with the half jin denomination. They are associated with the states of Han, Zhao, Liang, Zhou, and Yan. They are found in the provinces of Inner Mongolia, Jilin, Hebei, Shanxi, Shaanxi, Shandong, Jiangsu, Anhui, Henan, and Zhejiang. The type is contemporary, along with the pointed foot spades. Some mints issued both types, and the two are found together in hoards.
- Sharp cornered spades': these form a distinct sub-series of the square foot spades. They differ slightly from the normal type as they have small triangular projections on the handle. The inscriptions of the three larger types include the characters jin (Chinese: 金; pinyin: jīn) and nie (Chinese: 涅; pinyin: niè). While nie was the name of a river in Henan, the character cannot be readily construed as part of a place name, as it is found in conjunction with other place names such as Lu Shi and Yu. According to the Fang Yan (an ancient book on dialects),nie meant the same as hua (Chinese: 化; pinyin: huà), money or coin. Thus the characters jin nie mean “metal coin”. The weights of the larger coins seem slightly higher than the 14 grams of the jin standard. Their find spots correspond with the states of Liang and Han.
- Dang Jin spades: these constitute another sub-group whose inscriptions suggest equivalence between the units of two trading areas. Both the small and large coins have a character jin (Chinese: 伒; pinyin: jìn) in their inscription. This is normally taken as being the same as the jin unit found on other flat handled spade coins. However, the 28 gram weight of these coins suggests that their unit was twice the 14 grams of the flat handled spade jin, so perhaps it was a local unit of the area. The smaller coin is often found as two joined together at the feet. This is how they were cast, but it is not clear if they were intended to circulate like this. Their weight is between 7 and 8 grams, roughly a quarter of the larger coins, so the inscription indicating that four were equivalent to a jin is logical. Their obverse inscriptions are a matter of some debate. Taking a consensus, the most logical reading is: [City of] Pei coin equivalent to a jin (Chinese: 斾比當伒; pinyin: pèi bǐ dāng jìn).
- Round foot spades: round handle, round shoulders, and round feet. A rare type. This type is represented by the coins of five cities in present-day Shanxi, between the Fen and Yellow River. There are two sizes, the equivalent of the one jin and half jin denominations. They have various numerals on their reverses. One school of thought ascribes them to the states of Qin and Zhao at the end of the Warring States period; another to the State of Zhongshan during the 4th century BC.
- Three hole spades: holes in the handle and feet. Round handle, round shoulders, and round feet. Another rare type. Two sizes are found. The large size has the inscription liang (Chinese: 兩; pinyin: liǎng) on the reverse; the smaller shi'er zhu (Chinese: 十二銖; pinyin: shí'èr zhū) (12 zhu). As the liang unit of weight was divided into 24 zhu, clearly the two sizes represent denominations of a “one” and of a “half”. They also have series numbers on the handle on the reverse. Like the Round Foot Spades, it is not definitely established which State issued them. Their find spots are in eastern Shanxi and Hebei. The mint names are cities that were occupied by both Zhong Shan and Zhao.

=== Three hole spades ===
The mystique and rarity which surrounds the "three hole spade" money (三孔布) is such that many Chinese coin collectors have dubbed it to be "the king of ancient coins". Three hole spades are often unique, with many variants of them being one-of-a-kind with some varieties being only known as fragments. While catalogues of ancient Chinese coinages have existed for over nine centuries, the existence of three hole spades has only been known to modern people for around two centuries because of their rarity. Most known examples of three hole spade money are in the hands of private collectors who reside outside of mainland China.

The attribution of three hole spades remains unclear. Three hole spades are believed to have circulated as a form of currency in what is now eastern Shanxi and Hebei sometime during the end of the Warring States period. Scholars are divided over the attribution and they have attributed it to Zhao, Zhongshan, and Qin. Based on archaeological finds and digs in the modern era as well as the placenames of the cities which have been identified from the obverse inscriptions on various three hole spades, the strongest evidence points towards the hypothesis that they were produced by Zhao. While the fact that they use the Zhu and tael denominations are used as arguments that they might have been produced by Qin.

The obverse inscription of a three hole spade usually contains the name of city where it was produced. While its reverse inscription reads its denomination which was either 1 tael (兩) or 12 zhu (十二朱). The 1 tael spades typically have a length of about 7.2 centimeters and are commonly known as "large" (three hole) spades. The 12 zhu spades typically have a length of about 5.2 centimeters and are commonly known as "small" (three hole) spades.

The first modern documented three hole spade occurred around two centuries ago during the Manchu Qing dynasty period when it was acquired by artist and epigrapher Zhang Tingji (張廷濟, 1768–1848). The seal script characters that appear on the obverse inscription of this three hole spade are Xia Qu Yang (下邲陽, xià qu yáng). The city of Xiaquyang is believed to have been located in present-day Ningjin County, Hebei. The reverse inscription of this three hole spade is believed to be 17 tael (十七兩, shí qī liǎng). This specimen has a length of 7.35 centimeters, a width of 3.7 centimeters, and weighs 13.4 grams.

Zhang Tingji had later recorded this spade in his coin catalogue "Ancient Coin Rubbings" (古泉拓本, gǔ quán tà běn), which had made the Xia Qu Yang three hole spade to be the first ever three hole spade to appear in any form of publication. During the early Republic of China period the Xia Qu Yang three hole spade was acquired by the famous Chinese coin collector Zhang Shuxun (張叔馴, zhāng shū xùn) and the rubbing of the Xia Qu Yang three hole spade has appeared in almost every major Chinese coin catalogue that has published since this period.

Based on specimens that have appeared in coin catalogues dating back to the Qing dynasty period, currently it is believed to be that there are more than 10 different city names that were used as obverse inscriptions for three hole spades and that there may be more than 30 varieties of the three hole spade in existence. Modern Chinese numismatists and scholars are puzzled as to why an ancient state would manufacture so many different varieties of a coin in such small quantities.

- In the year 2010 a three hole spade with the obverse inscription Wu Yang (武陽, wǔ yáng) was sold at a China Guardian Auction for about US$567,000 (or 3,528,000 yuan).
- A three hole spade was sold at an auction on November 25, 2012 hosted by the Beijing ChengXuan Auctions Co., Ltd (北京诚轩拍卖有限公司) for US$591,000 (or 3,680,000 yuan), which at the time had set a new world record for auctioning off an ancient Chinese coin.
- A three hole spade shown here was sold on April 23, 2013 at an online auction hosted by Huaxia Coin Grading (华夏古泉网) for an approximate amount of US$ 402,675 (or 2,475,000 yuan). The obverse inscription of this three hole spade reads Yang Jian (陽湔, yáng jiān), the city where it was cast, while its reverse inscription reads that its denomination was 1 tael (兩). The auctioned spade is 73.99 millimeters in length, it is between 2.00 – 2.13 millimeters thick, and has a weight of 16.33 grams. It is notably the only known "large" Yang Jian spade known to exist.
- The only known "small" (or "12 zhu") Yang Jian three hole spade known to exist is owned by the Tianjin History Museum (天津历史博物馆).
- Several specimens of three hole spades are in the collections of the National Museum of China, the Shanghai Museum, and the Bank of Japan Currency Museum.

== Silver spade money ==
In the year 1974, a farmer in Fugou County, Henan, had unearthed a bronze three-legged tripod (鼎, dǐng). Stashed inside this bronze tripod were eighteen specimens of spade money. 1 of these spades was a hollow-handled spade (空首幣), while all the remaining 17 spade money were flat-handled spades (平首幣). All of these unearthed spades are notably made of silver and are now on display at the Henan Museum.

This also notably makes it China's first ever recorded instance of silver coinage, according to an article in "China Numismatics Volume 3 of 1983" (simplified Chinese: 中国钱币 1983年第3期; traditional Chinese: 中國錢幣 1983年第3期; pinyin: zhōng guó qián bì yì qiān jiǔ bǎi bā shí sān nián dì sān qī).

== Guanzhuang Mint ==
Two spade coins and a dozen moulds were discovered at the Guanzhuang Mint, these were attributed to have been produced between 640 BCE and no later than 550 BCE, which according to Hao Zhao, an archaeologist at Zhengzhou University, in an article published in Antiquity makes it the world's oldest known mint.

The walled and moated city of Guanzhuang itself (in present-day Henan Province) was established around 800 BCE, and its foundry, where bronze was cast and beaten into ritual vessels, weapons, and tools, opened around the year 770 BCE. Excavations occurred between the years 2015 and 2019. Hao Zhao claimed that it wasn’t for another 150 years that workers at the Guanzhuang foundry would also begin to mint spade coins outside the inner city's southern gate. Zhao stated that while other research has dated coins from the Kingdom of Lydia (a historical country in present-day Turkey) to have been created as early as 630 BCE, he notes that the earliest mint known to have produced Lydian coins dates to sometime between 575 BCE and 550 BCE, which (if true) makes the Guanzhang Mint the world's oldest known mint. Meanwhile the proposed date of 650–500 BCE (based on ceramic typology) for the minting remains from the foundries at the Xintian and Xinzheng sites remains conjectural and has never been confirmed by radiocarbon-dating, but the radiocarbon-dating for the Guanzhuang Mint was more conclusive strengthening the hypothesis that the Chinese invented money rather than the Lydians.

The minting techniques that were employed at the Guanzhuang Mint are characterised by a number of things which indicate that the production of spade money wasn't a small-scale, sporadic experiment, but rather a well-planned and organised process such as batch production and standardisation, and quality control.

Bill Maurer, a professor of anthropology at the University of California Irvine and director of the Institute for Money, Technology and Financial Inclusion, noted that the completeness of the find gives weight to the assertions made in Antiquity. Mauer stated that usually coins tend to be found “bundled together and completely lacking any of the original context of their production or their use,” while in this case the entire mint as well as used casts were found. Mauer further noted that an entire foundry, which is full of carbon residue associated with the production of the item itself, was discovered lending more weight to the accuracy of the radiocarbon-dating proving the authenticity of the assertions made by the Zhao and other researchers.

Maurer further told National Geographic that the apparent level of standardisation of coin minting at the site "lends weight to the hypothesis that anthropologists and archaeologists have long held: that money emerges primarily as a political technology, not an economic technology." as they were found at a site of high political importance.

=== Criticism of Guanzhuang being the site of the world's oldest known mint hypothesis ===
George Selgin, director of the Center for Monetary and Financial Alternatives at the Cato Institute, says while he notes that it is an impressive find, "It doesn't change our basic understanding of when the first coins were produced. And it doesn’t necessarily mean that China did it first." saying that the find doesn't necessarily prove that the Chinese invented money before the Lydians did.

== Hoards of spade money ==
- In the year 2012 a Chinese villager in the province of Hebei digging a well in his yard had unearthed a large cache of knife and spade money which was dated to the Warring States period. The hoard included 98 specimens of knife money and 161 specimens of spade money. This was the first major hoard of ancient Chinese coinage from this era that had been unearthed in Laiyuan County, Hebei. Both the spade and knife money from this hoard were attributed to Yan. The hoard includes both "square foot" spades (方足布) and "pointed foot" spades (尖足布).
- On Monday 13 November 2017, the Henan Cultural Relics Department announced that an excavation near Zhoukou, Henan had unearthed a large number of tombs and cash coins that date to the Han dynasty period. Over 120 different tombs were discovered, of which 105 dated to the Han dynasty period and 15 to the Song dynasty and Qing dynasty periods. Most of the cash coins unearthed at the site were Wu Zhu (五銖) cash coins, while also a number of Xin dynasty spade coins issued under Wang Mang, and Song dynasty cash coins were also found in a number of tombs.
- On July 15, 2018 it was reported by the Xinhua News Agency that 504 Spring and Autumn period spade coins were unearthed at a construction site in Sanmenxia, Henan. The spades were preserved inside of a clay pottery cooker. Of the total of 504 spades that were unearthed, 434 had remained intact. Li Shuqian, the head of the local museum, noted that it was very rare for such a large amount of ancient Chinese coinage to remain preserved in such a good state.

== See also ==
- Ancient Chinese coinage
- History of Chinese currency
- Axe money
- Bullet money
- Knife money
