= Shihua (poetry talks) =

Shihua (simplified Chinese: 诗话; traditional Chinese: 詩話; pinyin: shīhuà; Wade–Giles: shih-hua – “poetry talks; poetry critique; comments on poetry”) is a Chinese form of poetic criticism that carries the character of suibi (隨筆 – “sketch, free essay”), a kind of “pure talk” about poetry.

Xu Yi 许顗 (Southern Song dynasty) wrote in his Yanzhou shihua 彦周诗话 (Poetry Remarks of Xu Yanzhou) about the shihua:

“詩話者，辨句法，備古今，紀聖德，錄異事，正訛誤也。”

[...] to distinguish poetic methods, to supply examples from past and present, to give account of sagely virtues, to record anomalous events, and to rectify faults and errors.

This genre allows the poet-critic to comment freely, without being bound to any fixed scheme: from the aesthetic appreciation of a single verse or even a single word, to the discussion of weighty literary issues – in any length or brevity. The genre of shihua began with the work Liuyi shihua (六一詩話) by Ouyang Xiu (1007–1072) and developed into modern China with Yinbing shi shihua (飲冰室詩話 "Poetry talks from the Ice-drinker's studio") by Liang Qichao (1873–1929).

Ouyang Xiu’s work is a forerunner of this genre of shihua during Song time. The poetry talks were categorized into two major schools: the Ouyang School, centered around Ouyang Xiu's work; and the Zhong School, centered around Zhong Rong's Shipin (诗品), mainly discussing poetry and rhetoric.

Alone in the Song dynasty, there were said to be over 140 different collections of shihua.

Various anthologies were compiled, such as Lidai shihua 历代诗话 (one of Wu Jingxu 吴景旭 (1611–1695), the other by He Wenhuan 何文煥 (1732–1808)) and Lidai shihua xubian 历代诗话续编 by Ding Fubao 丁福保 (1874–1952).

A Dictionary of ancient Chinese shihua and cihua (Zhongguo gudai shihua cihua cidian 中国古代诗话词话辞典) was published in 1992, a Dictionary of Chinese shihua (Zhongguo shihua cidian 中国诗话辞典) in 1996.

== Overview ==
According to its bibliography, the Hanyu da zidian (HYDZD) cites the following works with shihua in their titles (together with the editions):

- Ouyang Xiu 欧阳修: Liuyi jushi shihua 六一居士诗话 (abb. Liuyi shihua 六一诗话). Baichuan xuehai 百川学海
- Sima Guang 司马光: Sima Wengong shihua 司马温公诗话. Baichuan xuehai 百川学海
- Zeng Jili 曾季狸: Tingzhai shihua 艇斋诗话. Yihai zhuchen 艺海珠尘
- Liu Ban 刘攽: Liu Gongfu shihua 刘贡父诗话/ Gongfu shihua 贡父诗话. Baichuan xuehai 百川学海
- Chen Fu 陈辅: Chen Fu zhi shihua 陈辅之诗话. Shuofu 说郛（宛委山堂本）
- Su Shi 苏轼: Dongpo shihua 东坡诗话. Shuofu 说郛（宛委山堂本）
- Chen Shidao 陈师道: Houshan jushi shihua 后山居士诗话 / Houshan shihua 后山诗话. Baichuan xuehai 百川学海
- Pan Zizhen 潘子真: Pan Zizhen shihua 潘子真诗话. Shuofu 说郛（宛委山堂本）
- Ye Mengde 叶梦得: Shilin shihua 石林诗话. Baichuan xuehai 百川学海
- Wei Tai 魏泰: Linhan yinju shihua 临汉隐居诗话. Zhibuzuzhai congshu 知不足斋丛书
- Wu Qian 吴幵: Yougutang shihua 优古堂诗话. Duhuazhai congshu 读画斋丛书
- Zhang Biaochen 张表臣: Shanhu gou shihua 珊瑚钩诗话. Baichuan xuehai 百川学海
- Xu Yi 许顗: Xu Yanzhou shihua 许彦周诗话 / Yanzhou shihua 彦周诗话. Baichuan xuehai 百川学海
- Cai Xiu 蔡修: Jinyu shihua 金玉诗话. Shuofu 说郛（宛委山堂本）
- Zhang Jie 张戒: Suihantang shihua 岁寒堂诗话. Xuehai leibian 学海类编
- Lü Benzhong 吕本中: Donglai Lü Ziwei shihua 东莱吕紫薇诗话 / Ziwei shihua 紫薇诗话. Baichuan xuehai 百川学海
- Zhou Zizhi 周紫芝: Zhupo laoren shihua 竹坡老人诗话 / Zhupo shihua 竹坡诗话. Baichuan xuehai 百川学海
- Hong Mai 洪迈: Rongzhai shihua 容斋诗话. Xuehai leibian 学海类编
- Ruan Yue 阮阅: Zengxiu shihua zonggui 增修诗话总龟. Sibu congkan 四部丛刊影印明月窗道人校刊本
- Zhou Bida 周必大: Erlaotang shihua 二老堂诗话. Jindai mishu 津逮秘书
- You Mao 尤袤: Quan Tangshi hua 全唐诗话. Jindai bishu 津逮秘书
- Zhu Bian 朱弁: Fengyuetang shihua 风月堂诗话. Baoyantang miji 宝颜堂秘笈
- Wu Yu 吴聿: Guanlin shihua 观林诗话. Shoushange congshu 守山阁丛书
- Zhao Yuyan 赵与虤: Yushutang shihua 娱书堂诗话. Duhuazhai congshu 读画斋丛书
- Wei Ju’an 韦居安: Meijian shihua 梅涧诗话. Wanwei biecang 宛委别藏
- Yan Yu 严羽: Canglang shihua 沧浪诗话. Jindai mishu 津逮秘书
- Huang Che 黄彻: Gongxi shihua 巩溪诗话. Zhibuzuzhai congshu 知不足斋丛书
- Wu Hang 吴沆: Huanxi shihua 环溪诗话. Xuehai leibian 学海类编
- Da Tang Sanzang qujing shihua 大唐三藏取经诗话. Zhongguo gudian wenxue chubanshe 中国古典文学出版社
- Zhu Cheng 祝诚: Liantang shihua 莲堂诗话. Linglang mishi congshu 琳琅秘室丛书
- Qu You 瞿佑: Guitian shihua 归田诗话. Zhibuzuzhai congshu 知不足斋丛书
- Li Dongyang 李东阳: Lutang shihua 麓堂诗话. Zhibuzuzhai congshu 知不足斋丛书
- Xie Zhen 谢榛: Siming shihua 四溟诗话. Haishanxianguan congshu 海山仙馆丛书
- Wang Shizhen 王世贞: Yiyuan zhiyan 艺苑卮言. Lidai shihua xubian 历代诗话续编
- Min Wenzhen 闵文振: Lanzhuang shihua 兰庄诗话. Shuofu 说郛（宛委山堂本）
- Li Rihua 李日华: Tianzhitang shihua 恬致堂诗话. Xuehai leibian 学海类编
- Yu Bian 俞弁: Yilaotang shihua 逸老堂诗话. Lidai shihua xubian 历代诗话续编
- Chen Jiru 陈继儒: Sheshan shihua 佘山诗话. Xuehai leibian 学海类编
- Wang Zhaoyun 王兆云: Huichen shihua 挥尘诗话. Yanyun yi bian 砚云乙编
- Zhu Mengzhen 朱孟震: Yu si shihua 玉笥诗话. Xuehai leibian 学海类编
- Xu Shipu 徐世溥: Xuxi shihua 榆溪诗话. Yuzhang congshu 豫章丛书
- Li Yi 李沂: Qiuxingge shihua 秋星阁诗话. Zhaodai congshu 昭代丛书
- Wu Weiye 吴伟业: Meicun shihua 梅村诗话. Loudong zazhu zhuji 娄东杂著竹集
- Wu Qiao 吴乔: Weilu shihua 围炉诗话. Jieyueshanfang hui chao 借月山房汇钞
- Chen Hu 陈瑚: Wantan shihua 顽潭诗话. Qiaofanlou congshu 峭帆楼丛书
- Shi Guizhang 施闺章: Huozhai shihua 蠖斋诗话. Huo Yushan xiansheng quanji 蠖愚山先生全集
- Zhou Rong 周容: Chunjiutang shihua 春酒堂诗话. Siming congshu 四明丛书
- Wang Fuzhi 王夫之: Jiangzhai shihua 姜斋诗话. Qing shihua 清诗话
- Liu Luan 刘銮: Fengren shihua 风人诗话. Gengchen congbian 庚辰丛编
- Ye Xie 叶燮: Yuanshi 原诗. Qing shihua 清诗话
- Xu Zeng 徐增: Eran shihua 而庵诗话. Zhaodai congshu 昭代丛书
- Zhao Jingxiang 赵敬襄: Zhugang shihua 竹冈诗话. Zhaodai congshu 昭代丛书
- Yang Zongfa 杨宗发: Baiyunlou shihua 白云楼诗话. Datingshanguan congshu 大亭山馆丛书
- Gu Sili 顾嗣立: Han ting shihua 寒厅诗话. Zhaodai congshu 昭代丛书
- Shen Deqian 沈德潜: Shuoshi zuiyu 说诗晬语. Qing shihua 清诗话
- Xue Xue 薛雪: Yipiao shihua 一瓢诗话. Zhaodai congshu 昭代丛书
- Yuan Mei 袁枚: Suiyuan shihua 随园诗话. Renmin wenxue chubanshe 人民文学出版社
- Zha Weiren 查为仁: Lianpo shihua 莲坡诗话. Binglu congke 屏卢丛刻
- Lu Ying 陆蓥: Wenhualou shihua 文花楼诗话. Lushi chuanjia ji 陆氏传家集
- Wu Qian 吴骞: Baijinglou shihua 拜经楼诗话. Baijinglou congshu 拜经楼丛书
- Weng Fanggang 翁方纲: Shizhou shihua 石洲诗话. Yueyatang congshu 粤雅堂丛书
- Song Changbai 宋长白: Liuting shihua 柳亭诗话. Zhongguo wenxue zhenben congshu 中国文学珍本丛书
- Qin Chaoyu 秦朝纡: Xiaohan shihua 消寒诗话. Zhaodai congshu 昭代丛书
- Heng Ren 恒仁: Yueshan shihua 月山诗话. Yihai zhuchen 艺海珠尘
- Zhao Yi 赵翼: Oubei shihua 瓯北诗话. Renmin wenxue chubanshe 人民文学出版社
- Ji Fa 计发: Yujixuan shihua 鱼计轩诗话. Shiyuan congshu 适园丛书
- Zhou Chun 周春: Dieyu shihua 耋余诗话. Yushutang congshu 豫恕堂丛书
- Wu Songliang 吴嵩梁: Shixifang shihua 石溪舫诗话. Xiangsushanguan quanji 香苏山馆全集
- Zhang Xiecheng 张燮承: Xiao Canglang shihua 小沧浪诗话. Zhang Shiyun zhushu 张师筠著述
- Hong Liangji 洪亮吉: Beijiang shihua 北江诗话. Hong Beijiang quanji 洪北江全集
- Tu Shen 屠绅: Eting shihua 鄂亭诗话. Eryutang congshu 二余堂丛书
- Xie Kun 谢坤: Chuncaotang shihua 春草堂诗话. Chuncaotang ji 春草堂集
- Zhu Tingzhen 朱庭珍: Xiaoyuan shihua 筱园诗话. Yunnan congshu 云南丛书
- Kang Faxiang 康发祥: Boshan shihua 伯山诗话. Boshan quanji 伯山全集
- Zhang Weibing 张维屏: Tingsonglu shihua 厅松庐诗话. Zhang Nanshan quanji 张南山全集
- Yan Tingzhong 严廷中: Yaolan shihua 药栏诗话. Yunnan congshu 云南丛书
- Wang Tao 王韬: Dongren shihua 东人诗话. Taoyuan congshu 韬园丛书
- Fang Xun 方薰: Shanjingju shihua 山静居诗话. Biexiazhai congshu 别下斋丛书
- Wu Jingxu 吴景旭: Lidai shihua 历代诗话. Zhonghua shuju Shanghai bianjisuo 中华书局上海编辑所
- Ding Fubao 丁福保: Qing shihua 清诗话. Zhonghua shuju Shanghai bianjisuo 中华书局上海编辑所
- Ding Fubao 丁福保 (辑): Lidai shihua xubian 历代诗话续编. Zhonghua shuju 中华书局

others

- Zhong Rong 鍾嶸: Shipin 詩品

== Bibliography ==
- Hanyu da zidian. 1993 (one-volume edition)
- Wu Jingxu 吴景旭: Lidai shihua 历代诗话. Zhonghua shuju Shanghai bianjisuo 中华书局上海编辑所 1958
- He Wenhuan 何文煥: Lidai shihua 历代诗话 Zhonghua shuju 中华书局 2004
- Ding Fubao 丁福保 Lidai shihua xubian 历代诗话续编, continuation (xubian). Zhonghua shuju 中华书局 1983
