= Shengbao =

Currency of the Taiping Heavenly Kingdom

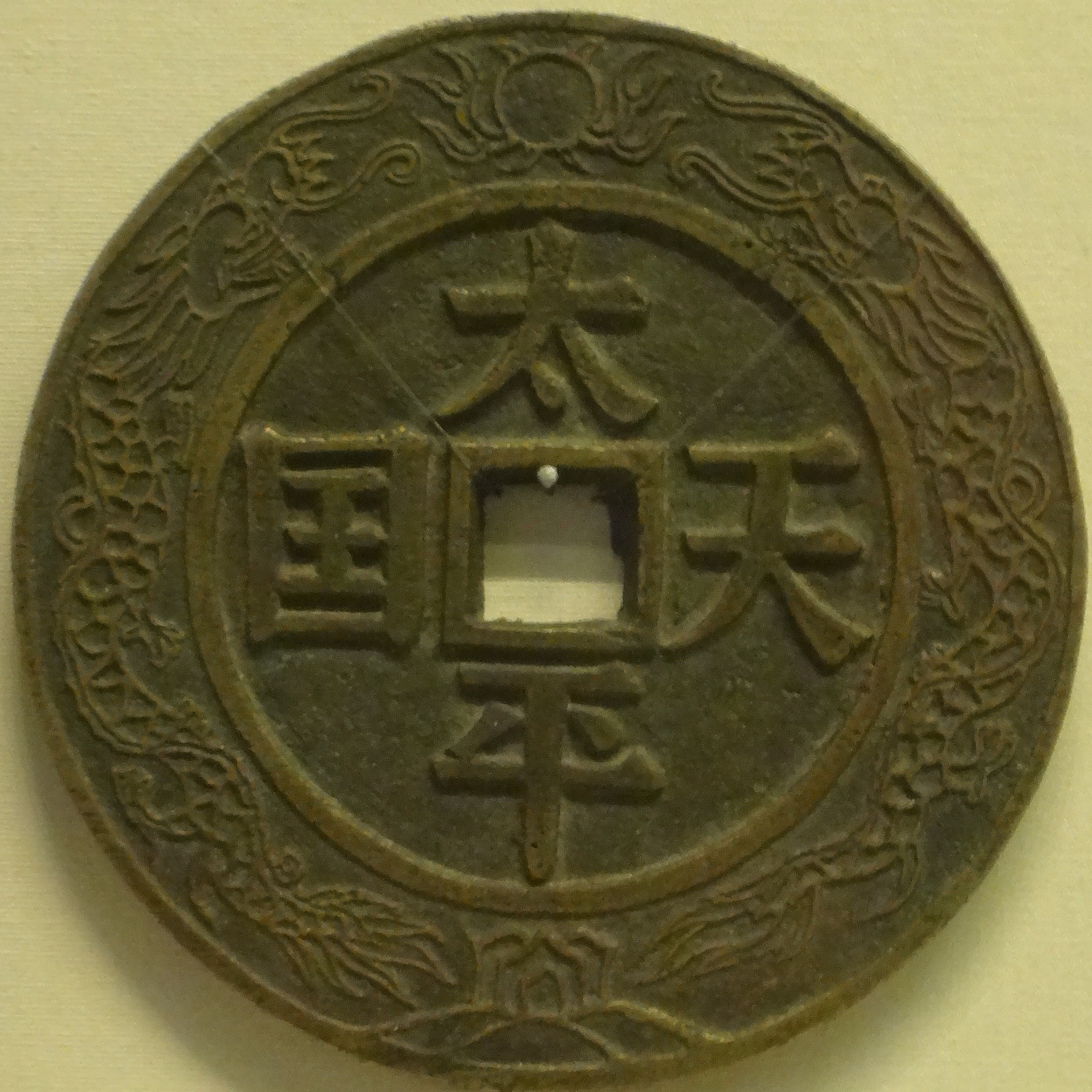
A vault protector coin of the Taiping Heavenly Kingdom.

The currency of the Taiping Heavenly Kingdom (traditional Chinese: 聖寶; simplified Chinese: 圣宝; pinyin: Shèngbǎo; lit. 'Holy treasure') consisted of Chinese cash coins and paper money, although the rarity of surviving Taiping paper money suggests that not much was produced. The first cash coins of the Taiping Heavenly Kingdom were issued in the year 1853 in the capital of Tianjing (present day Nanjing). The cash coins of the Taiping Heavenly Kingdom should not be confused with the Taiping Tongbao (太平通寳) which was issued during the Northern Song dynasty between the years 976 and 997, or with any other contemporary rebel coinage that also bear this inscription.

Most cash coins issued by the Taiping Heavenly Kingdom were made from bronze with a smaller quantity being made from either iron or lead. Taiping rebellion cash coins made from either gold or silver are also known to exist but are extremely rare. The reason why the Shengbao tend to be very diverse is because the central government of the Taiping Heavenly Kingdom had allowed local power-holders within their realm to produce their own cash coins within their jurisdiction.

== History ==
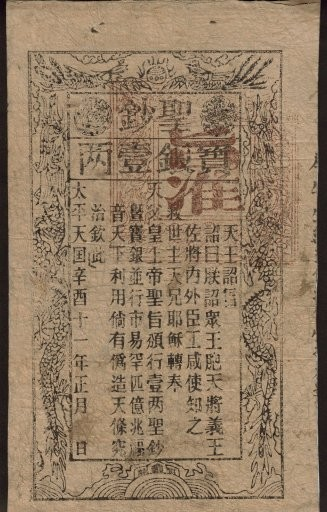
A banknote (or Shengchao, 聖鈔) of 1 tael issued by the Taiping Heavenly Kingdom.

In 1850 the Taiping Rebellion was started by the head of the God Worshippers Hong Xiuquan who founded the Taiping Heavenly Kingdom, this rebellion lasted until 1864. Despite its brief existence the Taiping Heavenly Kingdom is known to have cast a number of different cash coins and varieties of them the denominations of all Shengbao notably weren't written down on the cash coins and had to be deduced by weight which made it an inconvenience for the people, some varieties of Shengbao are extremely rare such as a variant of the Taiping Shengbao with the inscription written as "太平聖宝" (using the simplified Chinese character "宝") instead of the more conventional "太平聖寶". However, as Taiping rebellion era cash coins are very popular with coin collectors there are many fakes. There are also many "fantasy" cash coins (杜撰), fraudulent "copies" of coins that never actually existed.

Although very little documentation exists about the coinage manufactured by the Taiping rebels, it is known that in June 1853 the occupying Taiping rebels ordered copper workers in Tianjing with the skills to cast coins to open new furnaces for the production of cash coins with the inscription Tianguo Shengbao that were reported to be "the size of foreign coins" (Mexican pesos), these coins were reported to be of very poor workmanship and their production was quickly discontinued and although no coins fitting this description are extant it is known that Taiping rebels in other areas and provinces did cast coinage. The treasury of the Taiping Heavenly Kingdom was initially operated by village pawnbrokers, as was the custom in the rural areas of China at that time.

Cash coins with the inscription Taiping Tianguo (太平天囯) on the obverse and the Chinese characters Shengbao (聖寶) on the reverse are known to have been cast with inscriptions written in "Song period-style script" (方體宋子), regular script (楷書), and Yinqiwen (隱起文), the latter of which refers to a type of Chinese cash coin which de to their manufacturing process have characters that display an unevenness in the height of the strokes of the Hanzi characters which cause some strokes to rise a bit higher than others. Among the rares varieties of Shengbao cash coins include a Tianguo Taiping (天囯太平) cash coin which has its inscription written in "Song period-style script" with the Shengbao (聖寶) characters on the reverse side of the coin written in a vertical position which is referred to as zhí dú (直讀) or a "2 wén-sized" (折二) Tianguo Shengbao (天囯聖寶) cash coin with the characters Taiping (太平) written in a vertical manner on its reverse side.

Among the more common types of Shengbao are three types of cash coins, one was a Taiping Tianguo (太平天囯) written in regular script which had the characters Shengbao (聖寶) on their reverse and were issued in the denominations 1 wén (which were known as "Xiaoping", 小平, and weighed 3 grams), 5 wén (5 grams), 10 wén (8 grams), 50 wén (12 grams), and 100 wén (31 grams). These coins typically have wide rims which were excellently polished and were based on the Xianfeng era coinage produced at the Suzhou mint. The second type of common Shengbao originate from Hengyang, Hunan and are heavier than the first type but generally have a lower amount of copper in their alloy, their inscriptions are written in Song period-style script, have less accurately polished rims, and were issued in denominations of 1 wén, 10 wén, 50 wén, and 100 wén. The third type was also Hunanese in origin and bore the same inscription as the aforementioned coins written in regular script but the words Shengbao (聖寶) were written horizontally from right-to-left around the square center hole on the reverse, the Chinese characters of these cash coins were not protruding from the surface as high as those of the other types of Shengbao. These coins were issued in the denominations of 1 wén, 10 wén, 50 wén, and 100 wén.

== List of cash coins issued by the Taiping Heavenly Kingdom ==
The following cash coins are known to have been cast by the Taiping Heavenly Kingdom:

Obverse inscription (Romanised)	Reverse inscription (Romanised)	Denomination	Years of production	Catalogue numbers	Obverse image	Reverse image
Tongbao (通寳) cash coins.
天囯 (Tianguo)	通寳 (Tongbao) (Note: Closed head tong (通).)	10 wén	1853–1855	Hartill #23.1		
天囯 (Tianguo)	通寳 (Tongbao) (Note: Square head tong (通).)	10 wén	1853–1855	Hartill #23.2		
天囯 (Tianguo)	聖寳 (Shengbao) (Note: The bottom of the sheng (聖) is written with a long middle stroke, like "壬".)	10 wén	1853–1855	Hartill #23.3		
天囯 (Tianguo)	聖寳 (Shengbao) (Note: The bottom of the sheng (聖) is written with a short middle stroke, like "王".)	10 wén	1853–1855	Hartill #23.4, FD #2685, Schjøth #1608		
天囯 (Tianguo) (Note: "Tian" (天) written in a compressed style. Often found in Nanjing.)	聖寳 (Shengbao)	10 wén	1853–1855	Hartill #23.5		
Written in Song style. "Guo" (囯) square.
太平天囯 (Taiping Tianguo) (Note: There are degenerate examples of this type.)	聖寳 (Shengbao)	1 wén	1856–1860	Hartill #23.6		
太平天囯 (Taiping Tianguo) (Note: Narrow rims.)	聖寳 (Shengbao)	5 wén	1856–1860	Hartill #23.7, FD #2673		
太平天囯 (Taiping Tianguo)	聖寳 (Shengbao)	10 wén	1856–1860	Hartill #23.8, FD #2676		
太平天囯 (Taiping Tianguo)	聖寳 (Shengbao)	50 wén	1856–1860	Hartill #23.9, FD #2689		
Written in Regular script. "Guo" (囯) oblong.
太平天囯 (Taiping Tianguo) (Note: Found in the Jiangsu area.)	聖寳 (Shengbao)	1 wén	1860–1862	Hartill #23.10, FD #2669, Schjøth #1605		
太平天囯 (Taiping Tianguo)	聖寳 (Shengbao)	5 wén	1860–1862	Hartill #23.11, FD #2672		
太平天囯 (Taiping Tianguo)	聖寳 (Shengbao)	10 wén	1860–1862	Hartill #23.12, FD #2674		
太平天囯 (Taiping Tianguo)	聖寳 (Shengbao)	50 wén	1860–1862	Hartill #23.13, FD #2688		
Faint characters, seven stroke bei (貝). (Note: Ma and Ma attribute this type to the Hengyang Mint in southern Hunan.)
太平天囯 (Taiping Tianguo)	聖寳 (Shengbao)	1 wén	1856–1860	Hartill #23.14		
太平天囯 (Taiping Tianguo)	聖寳 (Shengbao)	5 wén	1856–1860	Hartill #23.15		
太平天囯 (Taiping Tianguo)	聖寳 (Shengbao)	10 wén	1856–1860	Hartill #23.16, FD #2675		
太平天囯 (Taiping Tianguo)	聖寳 (Shengbao)	50 wén	1856–1860	Hartill #23.17		
Six stroke bei (貝), left foot of bei (貝) curved.
太平天囯 (Taiping Tianguo)	聖寳 (Shengbao)	1 wén	1861–1864	Hartill #23.18		
Small characters
太平天囯 (Taiping Tianguo)	聖寳 (Shengbao)	1 wén	1861–1864	Hartill #23.19, Schjøth #1606		
Large characters
太平天囯 (Taiping Tianguo)	聖寳 (Shengbao)	1 wén	1861–1864	Hartill #23.20, FD #2670		
Others
天囯聖寳 (Tianguo Shengbao) (Note: Associated with the Hangzhou area.)	太平 (Taiping)	1 wén	1858–1864	Hartill #23.21		
天囯聖寳 (Tianguo Shengbao)	太平 (Taiping)	5 wén	1850s	Hartill #23.22		
天囯聖寳 (Tianguo Shengbao) (Note: Different style "Bao" (寳).)	太平 (Taiping)	1 wén	1850s	Hartill #23.23		
太平聖寳 (Taiping Shengbao) (Note: Seven stroke bei (貝).)	天囯 (Tianguo)	1 wén	1861–1864	Hartill #23.24, Schjøth #1604, FD #2668		
太平聖寳 (Taiping Shengbao) (Note: Six stroke bei (貝).)	天囯 (Tianguo)	1 wén	1861–1864	Hartill #23.25		
太平聖寳 (Taiping Shengbao) (Note: Seven stroke bei (貝).)	天囯 (Tianguo)	5 wén	1861–1864	Hartill #23.26		
太平 (Taiping)	聖寶 (Shengbao)		1860s			

== Vault protector coins of the Taiping Heavenly Kingdom ==
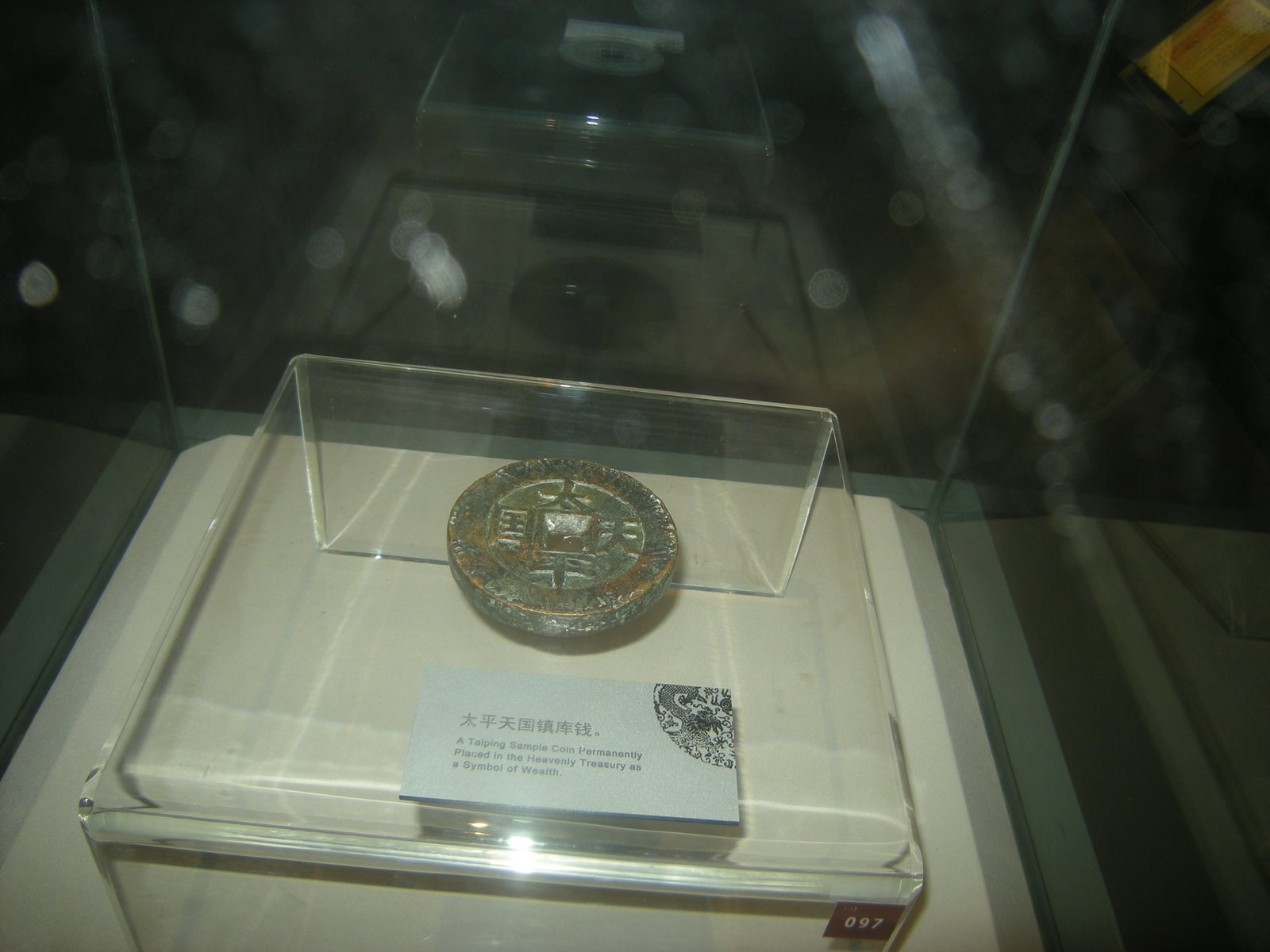
A vault protector coin of the Taiping Heavenly Kingdom on display at the Taiping Heavenly Kingdom History Museum in Nanjing.

During the later part of the Taiping Rebellion, the government of the Taiping Heavenly Kingdom cast a small number of vault protector coins with the inscription Taiping Tianguo (太平天囯), these cash coins were notably 7.6 centimeters in diameter and were also very thick. The reverse sides of these vault protector coins contained the characters Shengbao (聖寶, "holy treasure"). In his book "Coins of the Taiping Heavenly Kingdom" (太平天國錢幣), Chinese numismatist Ma Dingxiang (馬定祥) notes that the vault protector coins of the Taiping Heavenly Kingdom were manufactured in Hangzhou, Hunan, and Suzhou. There are only 5 or 6 of Taiping Heavenly Kingdom-made vault protector coins known to exist and these coins all tend to display some very slight differences between them.

A specimen that was previously in the collection of Ma Dingxiang and sold at auction held in the year 2011 for an amount of $111,286 (RMB 690,000).

== Surviving specimens ==
During the Great Leap Forward, Communist Party chairman Mao Zedong had encouraged every Chinese commune and urban neighbourhood to build their own backyard steel furnaces; this policy was proclaimed in the party's five-year plan in order to further accelerate China's economic and industrial development. In the villages "scrap iron" was to be collected for building these furnaces; this "scrap iron" was often collected from usable iron utensils and other iron tools. In one Chinese village a technician collecting the iron to build the local furnace received a string of between ten and twenty Taiping Heavenly Kingdom iron cash coins to be melted down to make the furnace; the technician thought that destroying these cash coins would be "a waste" and hid them in his pocket and secretly brought them to his house. Later these iron cash coins passed down to his descendants.

== Numismatics and research ==
According to a 2009 article in the numismatic journal Anhui Numismatics (安徽钱币) by Wen Su (文甦), the second edition of the "Ancient Chinese Coin Catalogue" (中国近代货币史) edited by Hua Guangpu (华光普) contained information about the cash coins of the Taiping Heavenly Kingdom. According to the catalogue, Taiping Heavenly Kingdom cast lead cash coins, iron cash coins, copper-alloy cash coins, silver cash coins, and gold cash coins. Of the 12 types of lead cash coins reported to have been cast only a single type has survived. The book only contains descriptions of the lead cash coins cast by the kingdom and doesn't contain any illustrations.

== See also ==
- Qing dynasty coinage

== Notes ==
=== Catalogue numbers ===
- Hartill = Cast Chinese Coins by David Hartill. Trafford, United Kingdom: Trafford Publishing. September 22, 2005. ISBN 978-1412054669.
- FD = Fisher's Ding (丁), George A. Fisher's copy of Ding Fubao's (丁福保) original work catalogue, 1980, 251 pages.
- Schjøth = "Chinese Currency, Currency of the Far East – A Comprehensive Text Chou Dynasty, 1122 B.C.–255 B.C. Through Ch'ing Dynasty 1644 A.D.–1911 A.D." by Fredrik Schjøth and Virgil Hancock, Oslow, Norway, 1929.
- Hartill-Qing = Qing Cash (清代貨幣) by David Hartill, Royal Numismatic Society (2003).
- Krause = C.L. Krause and C. Mishler, Standard Catalog of World Coins, Krause Publications, 1979.

== Sources ==
- Hartill, David (2005). Cast Chinese Coins: A Historical Catalogue. Trafford. ISBN 978-1-4120-5466-9.
