= Southern Tang coinage =

Historical Chinese currency

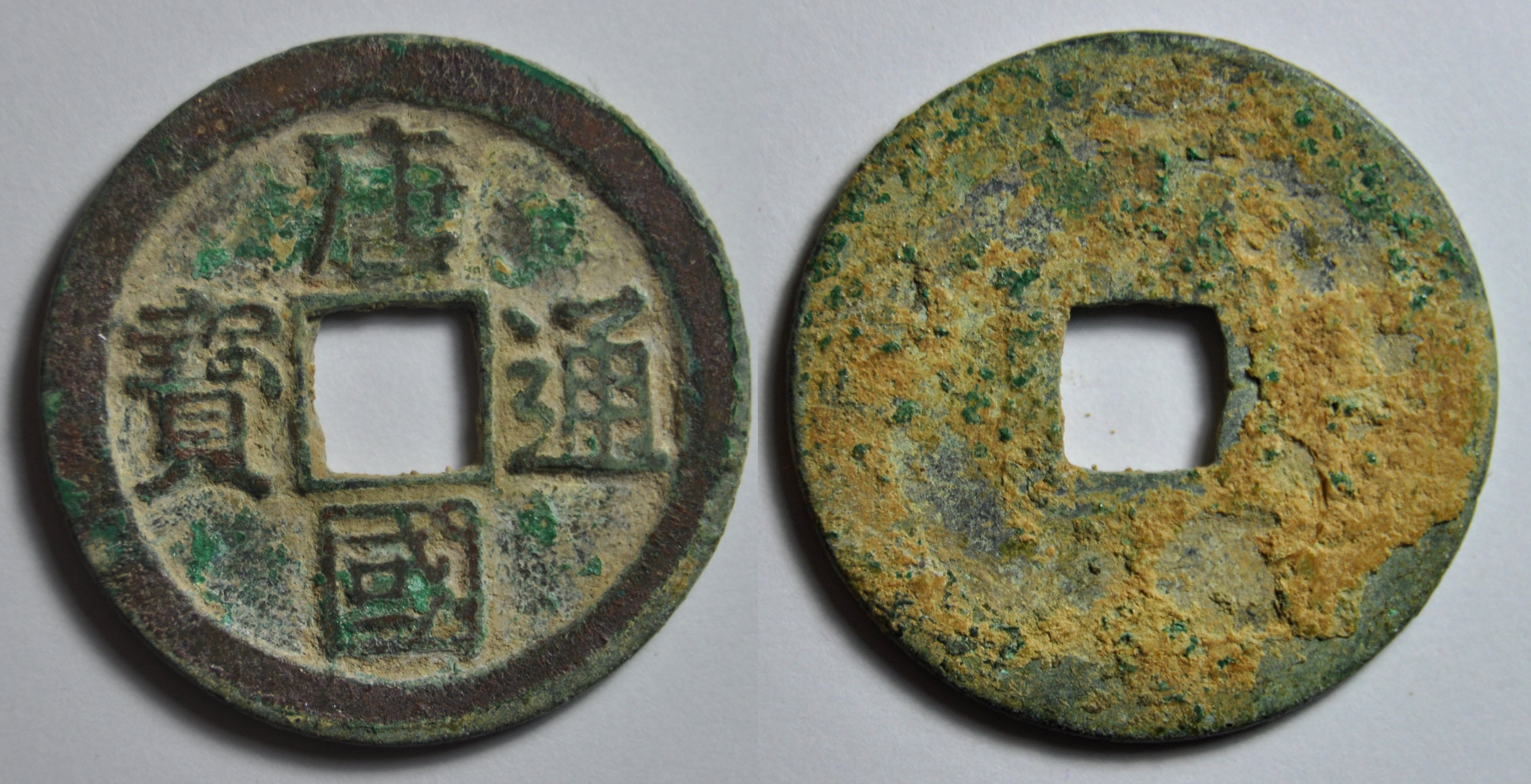
A Tangguo Tongbao (唐國通寶) cash coin with its inscription written in regular script.

The coinage of the Southern Tang dynasty (Traditional Chinese: 南唐貨幣) consisted mostly of bronze cash coins while the coinages of previous dynasties still circulated in the Southern Tang most of the cash coins issued during this period were cast in relation to these being valued as a multiple of them.

== History ==
=== Daqi Tongbao ===
It is widely believed by Chinese numismatists that when the Kingdom of Southern Tang was established by Xu Zhigao under the name Great Qi that Xu Zhigao, the Prince of Qi or by the founder of the Southern Tang with the original name of the Tang kingdom issued cash coins with the inscription Daqi Tongbao (大齊通寶), however only 2 specimens of this cash coin are believed to exist and the whereabouts of both of these are currently unknown as they have disappeared. Another variant of the Daqi Tongbao cash coins has 4 holes and is therefore known under the name of "four eye Daqi cash coins" (四眼大齊錢, sì yǎn dà qí qián). A large number of imitation Daqi Tongbao cash coins are also known to exist which were cast from the moulds of Taiping Tongbao (太平通寶) cash coins and feature a calligraphic style similar to them. It is very likely that during this period the cash coins of the earlier dynasties remained in use as the main currency in the Southern Tang kingdom.

=== Cash coins issued under Li Jing ===
Under the reign Emperor Li Jing who first used the reign title Baoda (保大), cash coins were cast both in bronze and iron with the inscription Baoda Yuanbao (保大元寶) from the year 943 until 957, however the bronze variants are extremely rare. In the year Xiande 5 (962) Li Jing cast the Yongtong Quanhuo (Chinese: 永通泉貨; pinyin: yǒng tōng quán huò; lit. 'Eternally circulating coin') which had a nominal value of 10 smaller bronze cash coins, however they only weighed 40% of how much value 10 cash coins usually weight. Li Jing was short of funds for his army at that time. These cash coins were cast in both clerical ("official style", 隸書, lì shū) and seal script (篆書, zhuàn shū). Some of the cash Coins with inscriptions in seal script are diminutive in size and lightweight. Li Jing’s minister Zhong Mo obtained permission to cast large coins, one of them being equal to ten smaller coins, with this inscription. In 964, the coin was withdrawn when Zhong Mo incurred the displeasure of the Emperor. It is also possible that the Yongtong Quanhuo cash coins were cast at a later date. As the people weren't used to fiduciary coinages they weren't accepted on the marked with their intended value.

The Datang Tongbao (Chinese: 大唐通寶; pinyin: dà táng tōng bǎo) cash coins which have their inscriptions written in li script were produced in the year 959. These cash coins are not as well-made as the later produced Tangguo Tongbao. There is exists a rare variety of the Datang Tongbao cash coins which is large in size and has a very broad rim. Usually a cash coin that bears the name of the dynasty would be cast immediately after its establishment however these Datang cash coins were minted as its second official series, it is possible that this was done as a form of propaganda as 960 was the year that the Song dynasty was established around that time these cash coins started being manufactured.

From the year Xiande 6 (963) Li Jing produced the Tangguo Tongbao (Chinese: 唐國通寶; pinyin: tang guó tōng bǎo) which are written in seal, li, and regular script. Initially the Tangguo Tongbao cash coins were cast in two different denominations, one had a weight of 12 grams and a nominal value of 10 wén (當十, dāng shí), these cash coins had their inscription written in seal script. The other denomination of the Tangguo Tongbao had a nominal value of 2 wén (當二, dāng èr). It is notable that the 2 wén Tangguo Tongbao cash coins were cast as "matched coins" (對錢, duì qián, 對品, duì pǐn, 和合錢, hé hé qián) where they were released with inscriptions written in multiple types of Chinese calligraphy which in this case were li script and seal script although some versions tend to have a large star above the square center hole on the reverse side of the coin, other than there difference in calligraphy "matched coins" tend to have the same weight, composition, thickness, diameter, size of the square center hole, Etc. This technique which was first introduced under the Southern Tang would become very popular in the succeeding Song dynasty.

Only a few years later the Tangguo Tongbao cash coins were cast in regular and seal scripts, these variants tend to have their inscriptions written in very small characters while they have a broad rim. Some versions of the seal script Tangguo Tongbao are quite rare such as a variety where there are large unusual characters while another variety has the "Tang" (唐, tang) character written with abbreviated strokes. A variant of the Tangguo Tongbao cash coin with the character "Wu" (五) has been reported to exist, however the authenticity of these specimens is doubtful.

Over the years both the Datang Tongbao and Tangguo Tongbao cash coins were being manufactured in lighter and smaller sizes, so it very unlikely that these cash coins would’ve maintained a nominal value of two Tang dynasty era Kaiyuan Tongbao cash coins.

=== Cash coins issued under Li Yu ===
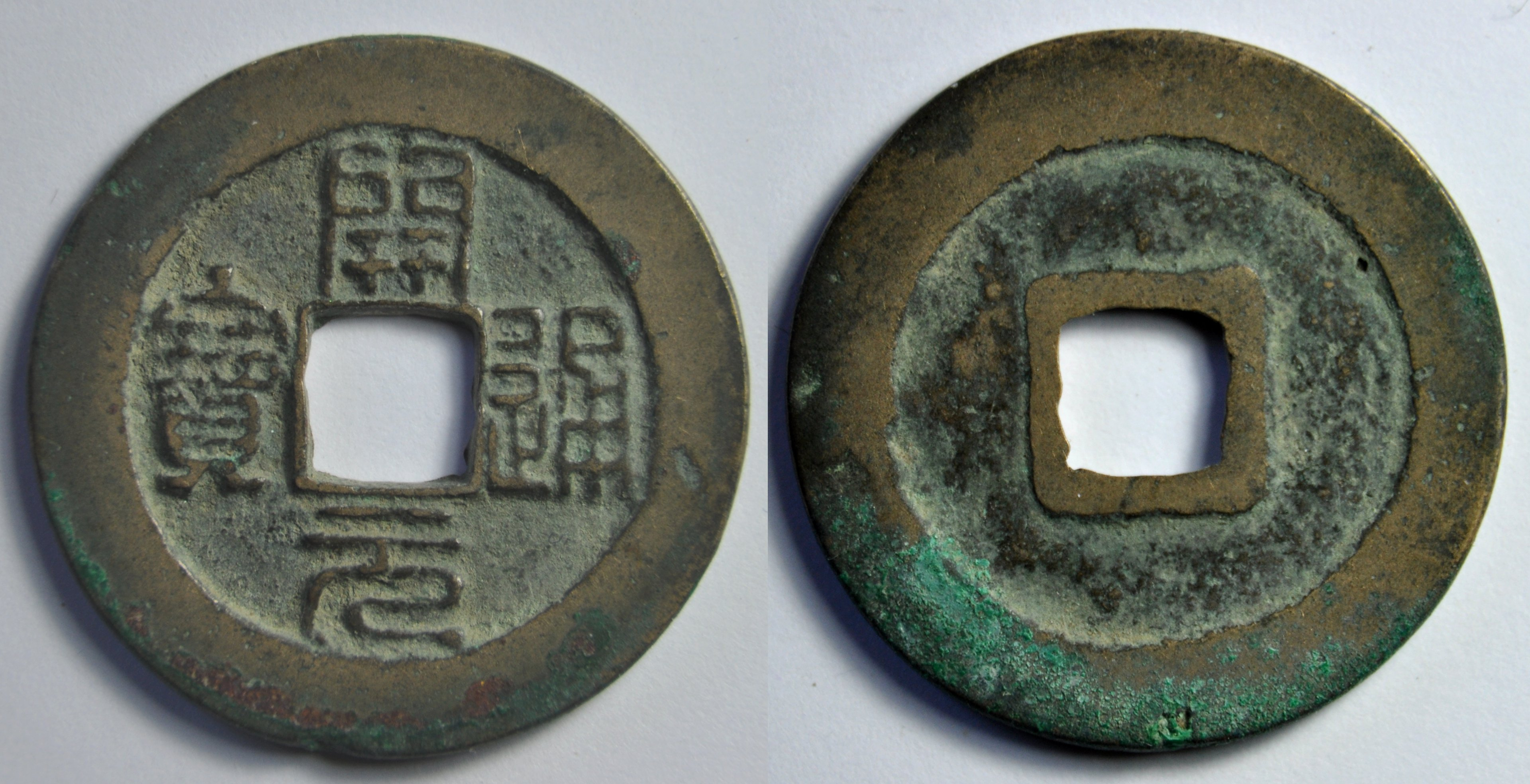
A Kaiyuan Tongbao (開元通寶) cash coin of the Southern Tang written in seal script.

In the year Qiande 2 (961) Li Yu ascended the throne, and the resources of the country being exhausted, his minister Han Xizai obtained permission to cast coins. These were Kaiyuan Tongbao (Chinese: 開元通寶; pinyin: kāiyuán tōng bǎo) cash coins and are written in both clerical (or li) and seal script and date from 961. These distinguished from Tang dynasty period Kaiyuan Tongbao cash coins by the broader rims, and the characters being in less deep relief. The seal script writing was devised by the scholar Xu Xuan. This coin was slightly larger than the old Kaiyuan Tongbao cash coins, and had broader rims, and was found convenient by both the government and the people. As they were massively produced these Kaiyuan Tongbao cash coins still exist in large quantities today. As the Tangguo Tongbao cash coins also exist in very large quantities today it's suspected that they continued to be manufactured during the first two years of the reign of Li Yu.

Among the variants of the Southern Tang era Kaiyuan coins are a variety which is large and appear to be very similar in appearance to the official script version of the Yongtong Quanhuo cash coins. Another variety of Southern Tang era Kaiyuan Tongbao cash coins is slightly smaller than the aforementioned coin but is actually still larger than a common type of cash coins. This version of the coin is believed to have been a 3 wén (當三, dāng sān) cash coin that may in fact have been a reduced weight version of a 10 wén cash coin. This variety is actually very rare.

== List of Southern Tang cash coins ==
Inscription	Traditional Chinese	Simplified Chinese	Script	Composition	Period minted	Catalogue numbers	Obverse image	Reverse image
Daqi Tongbao (Note: Said to have been cast in 937 by the Prince of Qi or by the founder of the Southern Tang dynasty with the original name of the Tang kingdom. Only two specimens were known, and these have both now disappeared.)	大齊通寳	大齐通宝	Clerical script	Bronze	937	Hartill #15.104, FD #822		
Baoda Yuanbao - Tian	保大元寳 - 天	保大元宝 - 天	Clerical script	Iron	943–957	Hartill #15.77, FD #812		
Baoda Yuanbao - Tian (Note: There is an extremely rare bronze version of this cash coin.)	保大元寳 - 天	保大元宝 - 天	Clerical script	Bronze	943–957			
Yongtong Quanhuo	永通泉貨	永通泉货	Clerical script	Bronze	959–964	Hartill #15.78, FD #809, Schjøth #439		
Yongtong Quanhuo	永通泉貨	永通泉货	Seal script	Bronze	959–964	Hartill #15.79, FD #808		
Tangguo Tongbao (Note: Reverse: Plain.)	唐國通寳	唐国通宝	Seal script	Bronze	From 959	Hartill #15.80, Schjøth #441		
Tangguo Tongbao (Note: Reverse: Large dot above, further information: "Han dynasty coinage § Dots, crescents, circles, numbers, counting rods, Chinese characters, and other symbols appearing on coins".)	唐國通寳	唐国通宝	Seal script	Bronze	From 959	Hartill #15.81		
Tangguo Tongbao (Note: Reverse: Crescent above.)	唐國通寳	唐国通宝	Seal script	Bronze	From 959	Hartill #15.82		
Tangguo Tongbao (Note: Larger characters.)	唐國通寳	唐国通宝	Seal script	Bronze	From 959	Hartill #15.83, FD #814, Schjøth #442		
Tangguo Tongbao (Note: Smaller characters, short strokes at top of "Tang" (唐).)	唐國通寳	唐国通宝	Seal script	Bronze	From 959	Hartill #15.84		
Tangguo Tongbao	唐國通寳	唐国通宝	Seal script	Iron	From 959	Hartill #15.85		
Tangguo Tongbao (Note: A large cash coin, worth 10 regular size cash coins.)	唐國通寳	唐国通宝	Seal script	Bronze	From 959	Hartill #15.86, FD #818		
Tangguo Tongbao (Note: Reverse: Plain.)	唐國通寳	唐国通宝	Clerical script	Bronze	From 959	Hartill #15.87, Schjøth #445		
Tangguo Tongbao (Note: Reverse: Large dot above.)	唐國通寳	唐国通宝	Clerical script	Bronze	From 959	Hartill #15.88, FD #816		
Tangguo Tongbao	唐國通寳	唐国通宝	Clerical script	Iron	From 959	Hartill #15.89		
Tangguo Tongbao (Note: Small cash coin. Reverse: Plain.)	唐國通寳	唐国通宝	Clerical script	Bronze	From 959	Hartill #15.90, FD #817, Schjøth #444		
Tangguo Tongbao (Note: Small cash coin. Reverse: Crescent above.)	唐國通寳	唐国通宝	Clerical script	Bronze	From 959	Hartill #15.91		
Tangguo Tongbao	唐國通寳	唐国通宝	Clerical script	Lead	From 959	Hartill #15.92		
Tangguo Tongbao (Note: One dot tong (通). Reverse: Plain.)	唐國通寳	唐国通宝	Regular script	Bronze	From 959	Hartill #15.93, FD #815		
Tangguo Tongbao (Note: Smaller cash coin.)	唐國通寳	唐国通宝	Regular script	Bronze	From 959	Hartill #15.94		
Datang Tongbao (Note: Regular size.)	大唐通寳	大唐通宝	Clerical script	Bronze	From 959	Hartill #15.95, FD #819, Schjøth #440		
Datang Tongbao (Note: Smaller cash coin.)	大唐通寳	大唐通宝	Clerical script	Bronze	From 959	Hartill #15.96, FD #820		
Datang Tongbao (Note: Smaller cash coin. Reverse: Crescent above.)	大唐通寳	大唐通宝	Clerical script	Bronze	From 959	Hartill #15.97		
Datang Tongbao (Note: Smaller iron cash coin. Reverse: Crescent above.)	大唐通寳	大唐通宝	Clerical script	Iron	From 959	Hartill #15.98		
Kaiyuan Tongbao (Note: Reverse: Plain)	開元通寳	开元通宝	Seal script	Bronze	From 961	Hartill #15.99, FD #821, Schjøth #446		
Kaiyuan Tongbao (Note: Reverse: Large dot above.)	開元通寳	开元通宝	Seal script	Bronze	From 961	Hartill #15.100		
Kaiyuan Tongbao (Note: In Clerical (Li) script. Distinguished from Tang dynasty period Kaiyuan Tongbao cash coins (Hartill #14.1 &c) by the broader rims, and the characters being in less deep relief. Reverse: Plain.)	開元通寳	开元通宝	Clerical script	Bronze	From 961	Hartill #15.101		
Kaiyuan Tongbao (Note: Reverse: Inverted crescent below.)	開元通寳	开元通宝	Clerical script	Bronze	From 961	Hartill #15.102		
Kaiyuan Tongbao (Note: Reverse: Crescent left, dot right.)	開元通寳	开元通宝	Clerical script	Bronze	From 961	Hartill #15.103		

== Vault protector coins ==
The earliest known vault protector coin (鎮庫錢) known to exist is the Datang Zhenku (大唐镇库) which translates as "the Vault Protector of the Tang Dynasty" and was cast during the Baoda period of Li Jing. The diameter of these Datang Zhenku vault protector coins is 6 cm, and they have a thickness of 0.6 cm, the diameter of the square center hole is 1.24 cm and the Datang Zhenku coin weighs 93.7 grams. Only one of these vault protector coins is known to exist and it was owned by a coin-collector from the city of Tianjin named Fang Yaoyu (方藥雨) during the beginning of the twentieth century and it was later owned by another private coin-collector called Chen Rentao (陳仁濤) before it ended up in the collection of the National Museum of China during the 1950s. This vault protector coin was depicted on a silver commemorative coin issued by the People's Republic of China in 1998.

== See also ==
- Southern Song dynasty coinage

== Notes ==
=== Catalogue numbers ===
- Hartill = Cast Chinese Coins by David Hartill. Trafford, United Kingdom: Trafford Publishing. September 22, 2005. ISBN 978-1412054669.
- FD = Fisher's Ding (丁), George A. Fisher's copy of Ding Fubao's (丁福保) original work catalogue, 1980, 251 pages.
- Schjøth = "Chinese Currency, Currency of the Far East – A Comprehensive Text Chou Dynasty, 1122 B.C.–255 B.C. Through Ch'ing Dynasty 1644 A.D.–1911 A.D." by Fredrik Schjøth and Virgil Hancock, Oslow, Norway, 1929.
- Hartill-Qing = Qing Cash (清代貨幣) by David Hartill, Royal Numismatic Society (2003).
- Krause = C.L. Krause and C. Mishler, Standard Catalog of World Coins, Krause Publications, 1979.
