= Liuyi jushi shihua =

Liuyi jushi shihua (simplified Chinese: 六一居士诗话; traditional Chinese: 六一居士詩話; “Remarks on Poetry from the Retired Scholar with Six Single Things”), abbreviated Liuyi shihua (simplified Chinese: 六一诗话; traditional Chinese: 六一詩話; pinyin: Liùyī shīhuà), are poetry talks (shihua) by Ouyang Xiu 欧阳修 (1007–1072) of the Song dynasty, primarily focusing on poets, poetry and related events. Its length is 1 juan. One of Ouyang Xiu's art names was Liu Yi Jushi (六一居士), in English the work can therefore also shortly be called Liuyi's Remarks on Poetry.

Ouyang's work is a forerunner of this genre of shihua during Song time. The poetry talks were categorized into two major schools: the Ouyang School, centered around Ouyang Xiu's work; and the Zhong School, centered around Zhong Rong's Shipin (诗品), mainly discussing poetry and rhetoric.

The Hanyu da zidian (HYDZD) for example refers to the edition of the Baichuan xuehai 百川学海.

== See also ==
- Shihua 詩話 (in Chinese)

== Bibliography ==
- Hanyu da zidian. 1993 (one-volume edition)
