= Luo Yuan =

Luo Yuan is the pinyin romanization of various Chinese names. It may refer to:

- Luo Yuan (scholar) (羅願), Southern Song scholar and author of the Erya Yi
- Luo Yuan (admiral) (罗援) (born 1950), rear admiral in the PRC navy
