= Luo Yuan (scholar) =

Song dynasty scholar

Luo Yuan (simplified Chinese: 罗愿; traditional Chinese: 羅願; pinyin: Luó Yuàn, 1136–1184), courtesy name Duanliang (Chinese: 端良; pinyin: Duānliáng), was a Chinese scholar and literary critic of the Song dynasty. One of the posts as official he held, was in Ezhou, after which he was also known as Luo Ezhou, and he authored the work Ezhou xiaoji (鄂州小集), published in the Yueyatang congshu (粤雅堂丛书). Luo Yuan was known for his precise analyses of classical texts.

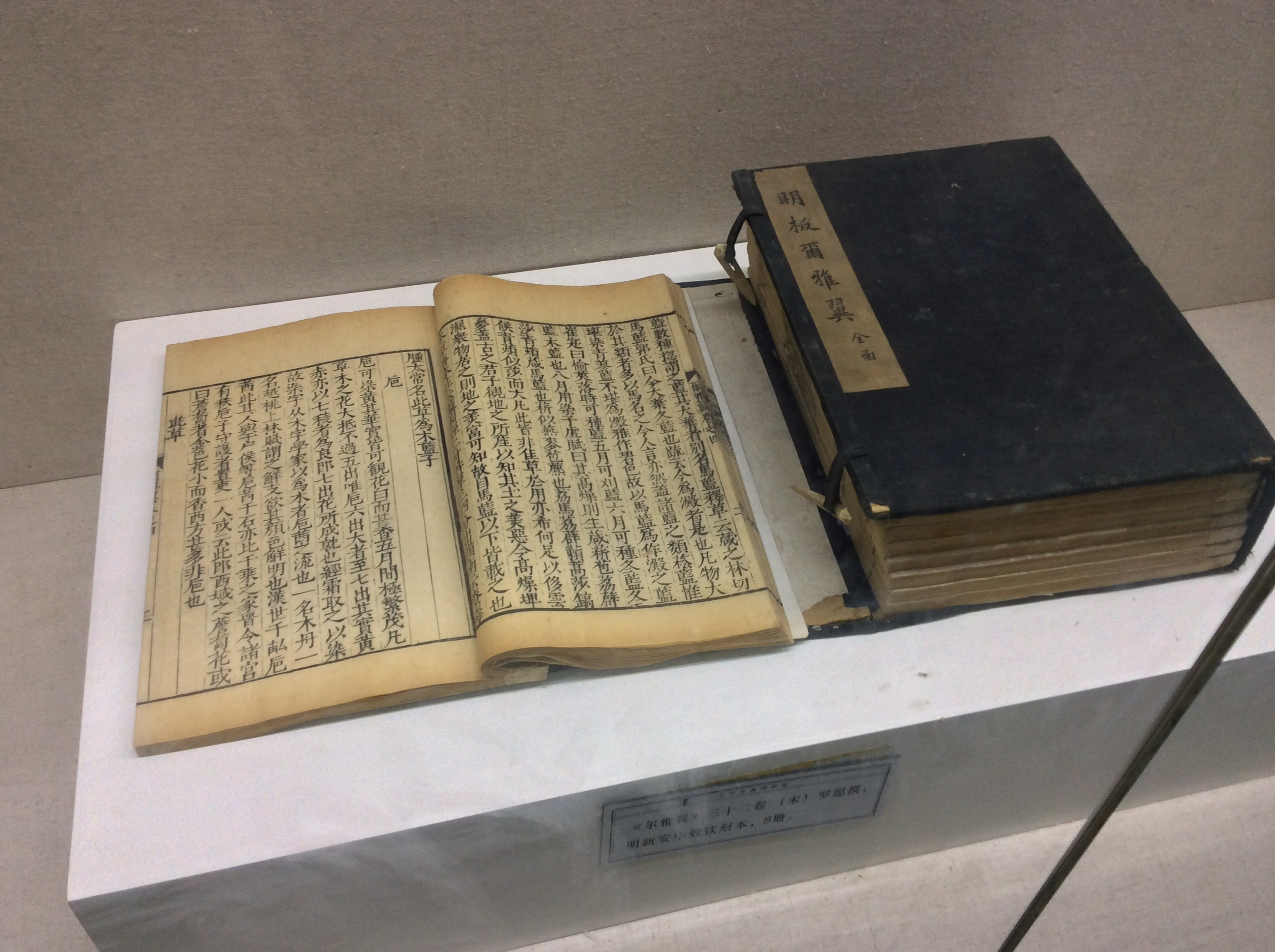
Erya yi in the Chinese Dictionary Museum (House of the Huangcheng Chancellor)

His commentary Erya yi 尔雅翼 ("Wings of the Erya"), a commentary on the Erya (尔雅, China's earliest surviving dictionary), appeared in the edition Xuejin taoyuan (学津讨原).

The Xin’an zhi 新安志 (The Chronicle of Xin'an) compiled by him is one of the 33 surviving local gazetteers of the Song dynasty and one of the works that had a significant influence on the development of Chinese local histories. Luo was an expert in natural and factual knowledge and was particularly noted for his skill in source criticism. The Hanyu da zidian, for example, makes use of Luo's publications Ezhou xiaoji 鄂州小集 and Erya yi 尔雅翼.

== Works ==
- Xin’an zhi 新安志, 10 juan
- Erya yi 尔雅翼, 20 juan
- Ezhou xiaoji 鄂州小集, 7 juan

== See also ==
- Glossary of Chinese Textual Criticism (in German)
