= Vault protector coin =

Chinese numismatic charm coin

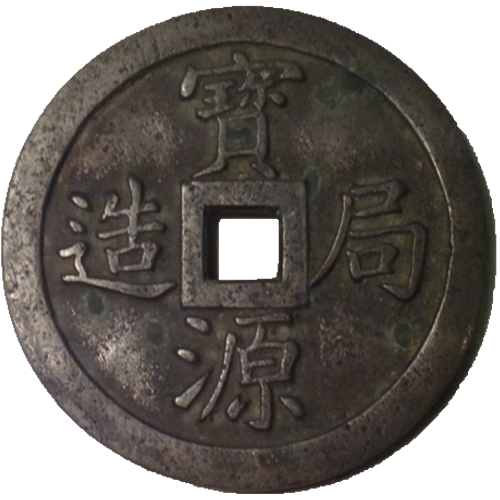
A Vault Protector coin made by the Ministry of Public Works Mint in Beijing

Vault Protector coins (traditional Chinese: 鎮庫錢; simplified Chinese: 镇库钱; pinyin: zhèn kù qián) were a type of Chinese numismatic charm coins created by Chinese mints. These coins were significantly larger, heavier and thicker than regular cash coins and were well-made as they were designed to occupy a special place within the treasury of the mint. The treasury had a spirit hall for offerings to the gods of the Chinese pantheon, and Vault Protector coins would be hung with red silk and tassels for the Chinese God of Wealth. These coins were believed to have charm-like magical powers that would protect the vault while bringing wealth and fortune to the treasury.

Vault protector coins were produced for over a thousand years in China, with roots in the Southern Tang dynasty (Five Dynasties and Ten Kingdoms period) and production continued into the Qing dynasty.

== History ==
=== Early history ===
There is some speculation by the Chinese numismatist Guan Hanheng (關漢亨) that an enormous silver Ban Liang cash coin manufactured by the Kingdom of Qin in the year 336 BC had been cast to serve as some form of vault protector. In his book Ban Liang Huobi Tushou (半兩貨幣圖說), Guan argues that large silver Ban Liang was "cast in 336 BC to commemorate the firing of the furnaces that began production of the first Ban Liang cash coins of the Qin state" and that the large silver Ban Liang cash coin did not see any circulation as it was a commemorative issue.

=== Southern Tang ===
The earliest known vault protector coin known to exist is the Da-Tang Zhenku (大唐鎮庫) which translates as "the Vault Protector of the Tang Dynasty" and was cast during the Baoda period of Li Jing. The diameter of these Datang Zhenku vault protector coins is 6 cm (2.4 in), and they have a thickness of 0.6 cm (0.24 in); the diameter of the square center hole is 1.24 cm (0.49 in) and the Datang Zhenku coin weighs 93.7 grams (3.31 oz). Only one of these vault protector coins is known to exist and it was owned by a coin-collector from the city of Tianjin named Fang Yaoyu (方藥雨) during the beginning of the twentieth century and it was later owned by another private coin-collector called Chen Rentao (陳仁濤) before it ended up in the collection of the National Museum of China during the 1950s.

=== Qing dynasty ===
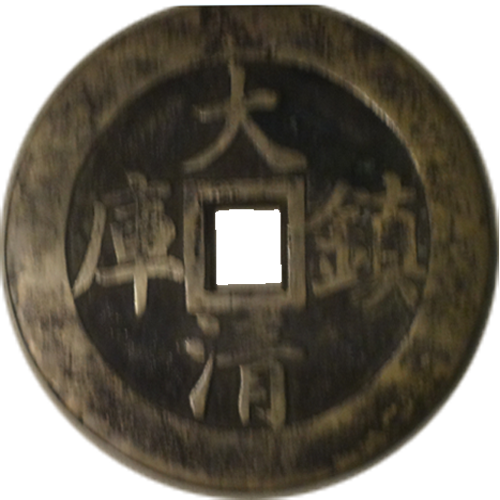
A Da-Qing Zhenku (大清鎮庫) vault protector coin of the Qing dynasty

==== Shunzhi era ====
Following the expansion of Qing rule into the Central Plain in 1644, the empire established new mints in Beijing. Almost immediately did the Qing start imitating Ming dynasty coinage, including vault protector coins. Two central government mints were opened in Beijing and they began to cast the Shunzhi Tongbao (順治通寶) cash coins closely modeled after the cash coins of the preceding Ming dynasty. A special Shunzhi Tongbao vault protector coin was cast that was 6 centimeters in diameter and contained the Manchu reverse inscription "Boo Yuwan" (ᠪᠣᠣ
ᠶᡠᠸᠠᠨ). Another variant of this vault protector coin exists which has the Chinese character "工" on the right side next to its square centre hole on its reverse side.

==== Xianfeng era ====
The Leizhou City Museum (雷州市博物館) in the city of Leizhou, Guangdong and the Palace Museum in Beijing both own a Qing dynasty era Xianfeng Tongbao (咸豐通寶) vault protector coin. The reverse inscription of this vault protector coin reads Da-Qing Zhenku (大清鎮庫, which could be translated into English as "Vault Protector of the Qing dynasty"). These coins have a diameter of 14 centimeters. The square centre hole is 2.5 centimeters in diameter, the vault protector coin weighs 1.05 kilograms. Only 5 of these vault protector coins were ever produced and during the beginning of the Republic of China, a eunuch had stolen all of them, the aforementioned two cash coins remained in China while the eunuch sold the other 3 Xianfeng Tongbao vault protector coins for what was purported to be "a large amount of money" to a British man. A description of this vault protector coin also appears in the book "Zhongguo Guqian Daji" (中國古錢大集) written by Hua Guangpu (華光普), where it is valued as being worth 1.200.000 yuan. The Leizhou City Museum came in possession of this coin during the 1950s, prior to this it was privately owned.

During the Xianfeng era another type of vault protector coins was cast by the Ministry of Public Works with the obverse inscription Baoyuan Juzao (寶源局造, which could be translated as "made by the Ministry of Public Works"). The reverse inscription of this coin reads Zhenku (鎮庫, "vault protector coin"). This vault protector coin is very large in its size and has a diameter of 11.52 centimeters, its square centre hole is 1.8 centimeters in diameter, and it has a weight of 837.3 grams. In 1936 Arthur B. Coole (邱文明) claimed that only four of five of these vault protector coins were ever produced by the Ministry of Public Works Mint in Beijing.

A Xianfeng Yuanbao (咸豐元寶) vault protector coin was cast at the Ministry of Public Works mint with a reverse inscription that reads "鎮庫 ᠪᠣᠣ
ᠴᡳᠣᠸᠠᠨ" (Zhen Ku Boo Ciowan). This vault protector coin a diameter of 117.43 millimeters and a weight of 902.1 grams.

Chinese numismatist Ma Dingxiang (馬定祥), in his book "The coins of Xianfeng" (咸豐泉匯), claims that the style of this vault protector coin is consistent to the styles of other Xianfeng era cash coinages. Furthermore, Ma Dingxiang claims that there exists only a single other specimen of a "companion vault protector coin" that was produced simultaneously by the Ministry of Revenue Mint in Beijing.

In 2009 a Baoyuan Juzao vault protector coin was sold at an auction in Tokyo, Japan. This same coin was sold at auction in the year 2013 for $408,279 (RMB 2,530,000). At the time of this auction, this sale had broken the record for the highest amount of money that was ever paid for a Qing dynasty era coin.

==== Qixiang / Tongzhi era ====
After the death of the Xianfeng Emperor, his son was crowned the Qixiang Emperor, however, after only one month his reign title was changed to the Tongzhi Emperor. Because if this only a very small number of cash coins using the Qixiang inscription was used, to commemorate the new emperor a Qixiang Zhongbao (祺祥重寶) vault protector coin were made, this coin does not have any characteristics that indicate which mint had produced it. The reverse of the Qixiang Zhongbao vault protector coin contains the inscription Da-Qing Zhenku (大清鎮庫). This coin had a diameter of 10.1 centimeters and a thickness of 0.47 centimeters.

A Qixiang Zhongbao vault protector coin was sold at an auction in Hong Kong in the year 2013 for $745,755 (HK$5,750,000).

==== Guangxu era ====
Under the Guangxu Emperor a bronze vault protector coin with the obverse inscription Guangxu Tongbao (光緒通寶) and the reverse side contains the Manchu inscription "Boo Yuwan" (ᠪᠣᠣ
ᠶᡠᠸᠠᠨ). This vault protector coin has a diameter of 6.2 centimeters and a thickness of 1 centimeter.

A Guangxu Tongbao vault protector coin was sold at an auction in the year 2010 for $51,485 (RMB 319,200).

=== Taiping Heavenly Kingdom ===
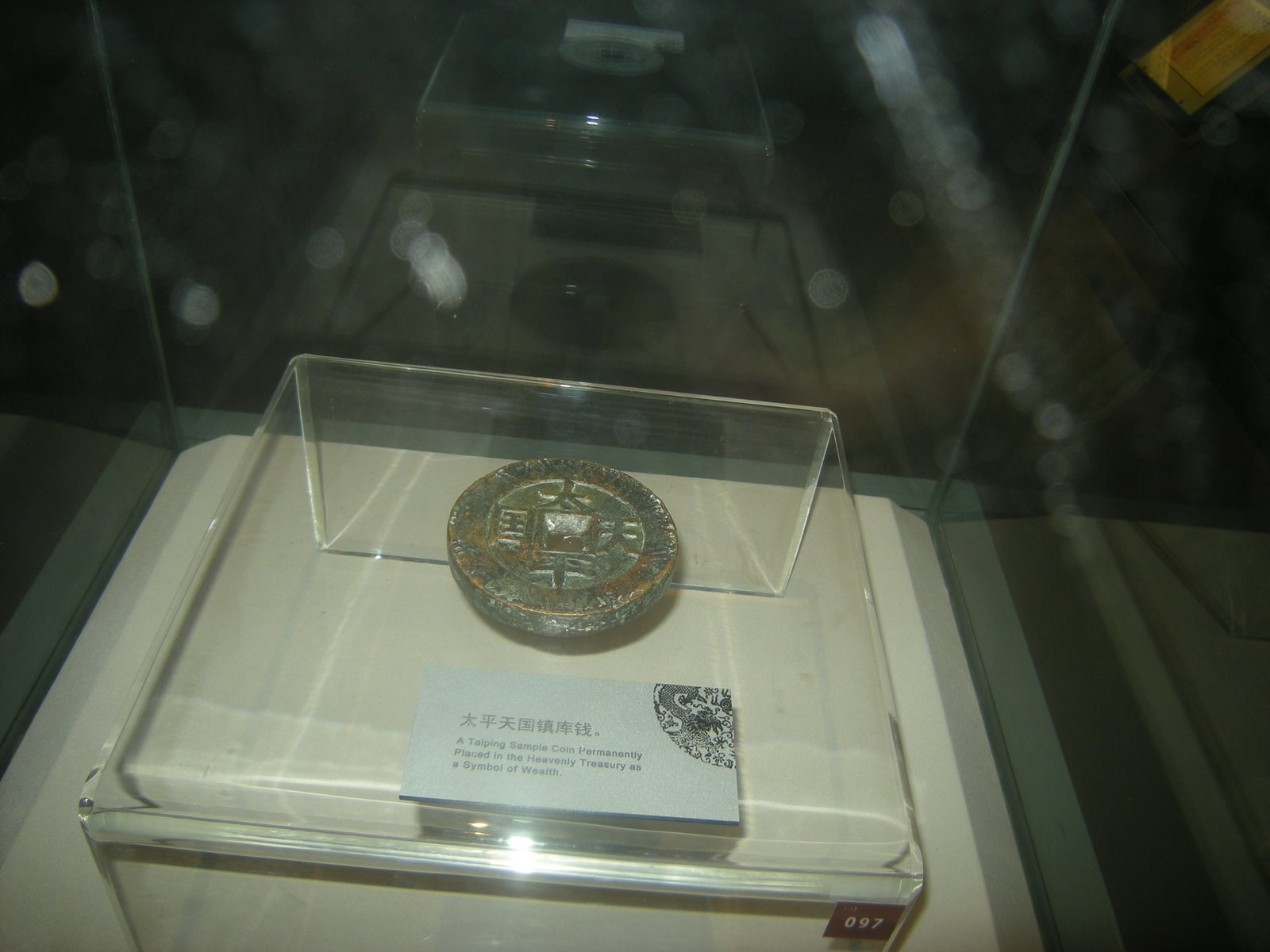
A vault protector coin of the Taiping Heavenly Kingdom on display at the Taiping Heavenly Kingdom History Museum in Nanjing

During the later part of the Taiping Rebellion, the government of the Taiping Heavenly Kingdom cast a number of vault protector coins with the inscription Taiping Tianguo (太平天囯), these cash coins were notably 7.6 centimeters in diameter and were also very thick. The reverse sides of these vault protector coins contained the characters Shengbao (聖寶, "holy treasure"). In his book "Coins of the Taiping Heavenly Kingdom" (太平天國錢幣), Chinese numismatist Ma Dingxiang notes that the vault protector coins of the Taiping Heavenly Kingdom were manufactured for the mints of Hangzhou, Hunan, and Suzhou. There are only five or six Taiping Heavenly Kingdom-made vault protector coins known to exist and these coins all tend to display some very slight differences between them.

A specimen that was previously in the collection of Ma Dingxiang and sold at auction held in the year 2011 for an amount of $111,286 (RMB 690,000).

== Modern reproductions ==
Due to the rarity of vault protector coins, there are reproductions and fakes on the coin collecting market. In the modern era vault protector coins are sought after both as collectible items as well as financial investments.

Furthermore, some commemorative modern coins made from precious metals are sometimes also based on pre-modern vault protector coins. In the year 1982 a gold coin based on a Xianfeng era vault protector coin was created, in 1990 another a gold coin version of a different Xianfeng era vault protector coins was created, and in 1998 a gold coin inspired by the Da-Tang Zhenku from the Southern Tang was produced.

== Modern influence ==
The design of the Da-Tang Zhenku vault protector coin was re-used for a silver commemorative coin issued by the People's Republic of China in 1998. This commemorative coin was shaped like the original vault protector coin on one side and depicted its denomination, the name of the issuing country, and ornamental designs on the other side.

== Gallery ==
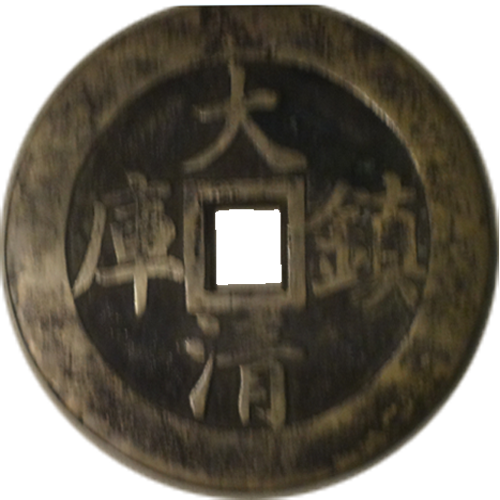
A Da-Qing Zhenku (大清鎮庫) vault protector coin of the Qing dynasty

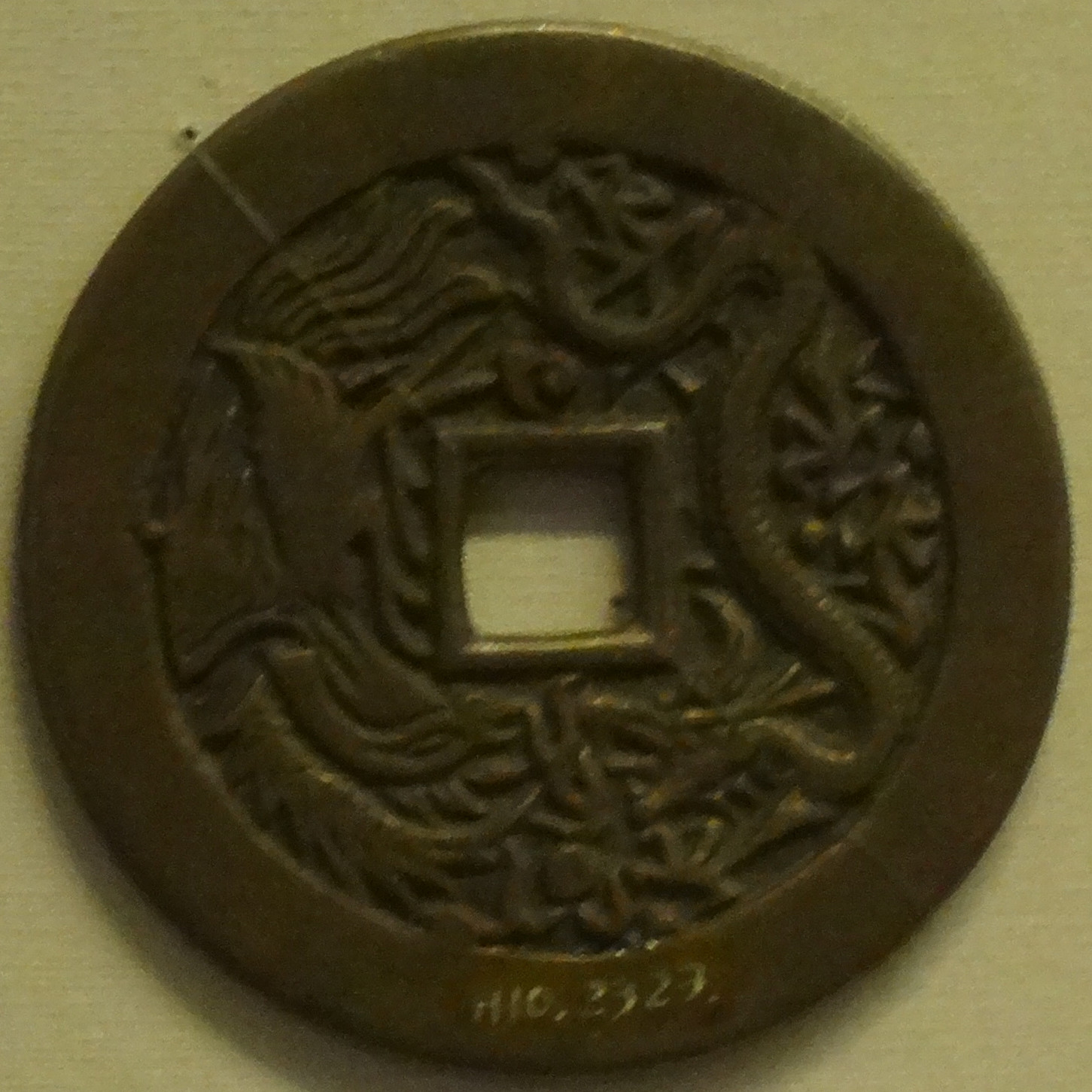
A vault protector coin of the Qianlong Tongbao (乾隆通寶) of the Qing dynasty

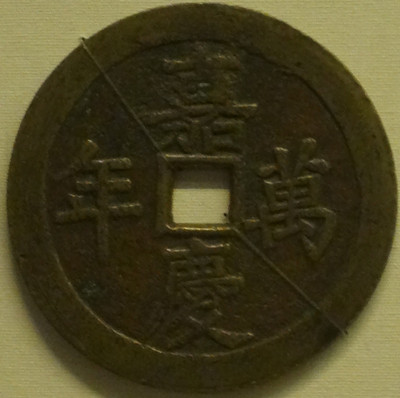
A Jiaqing Wannian (嘉慶萬年) vault protector coin of the Qing dynasty

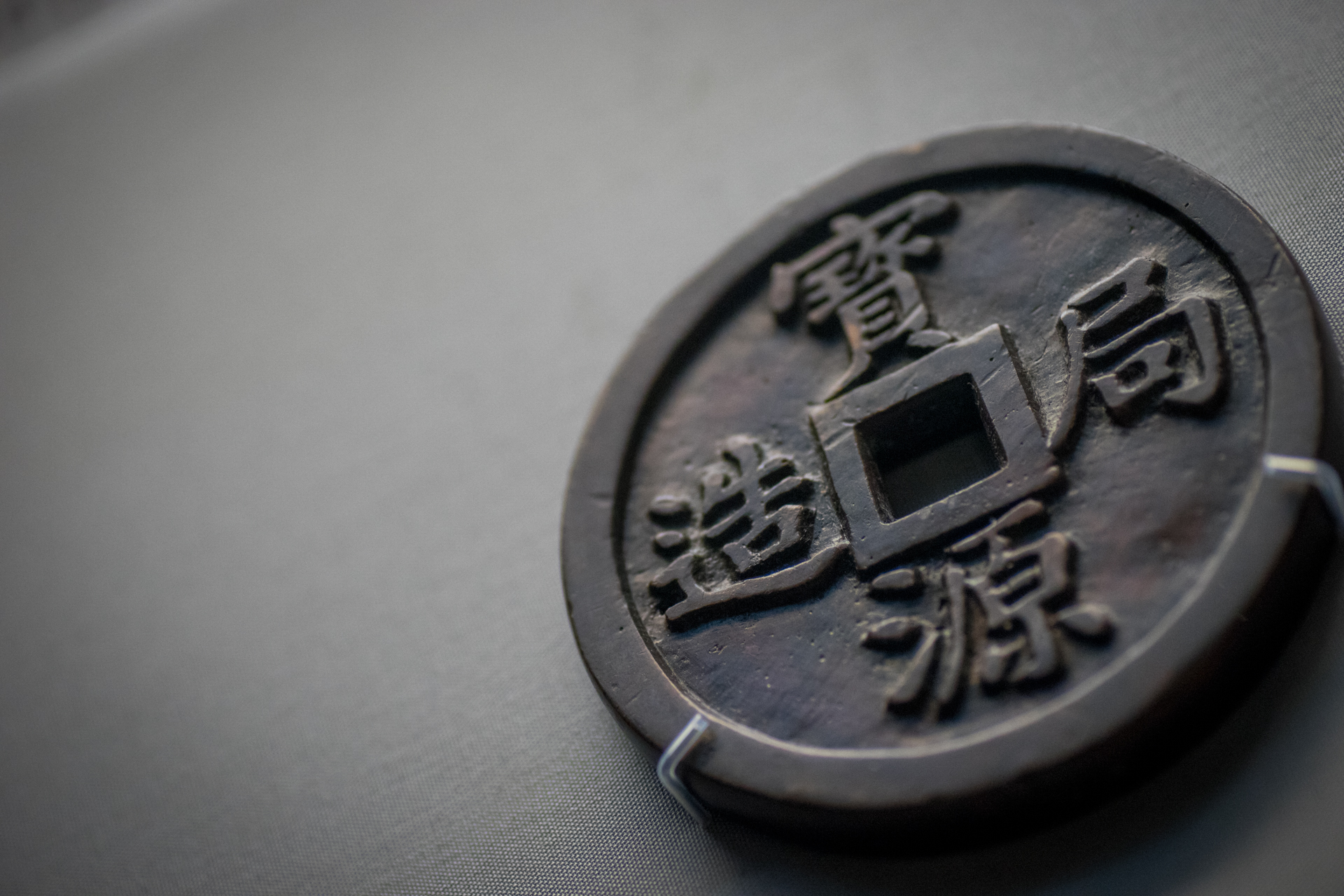
A vault protector coin of the Qing dynasty on display at the British Museum

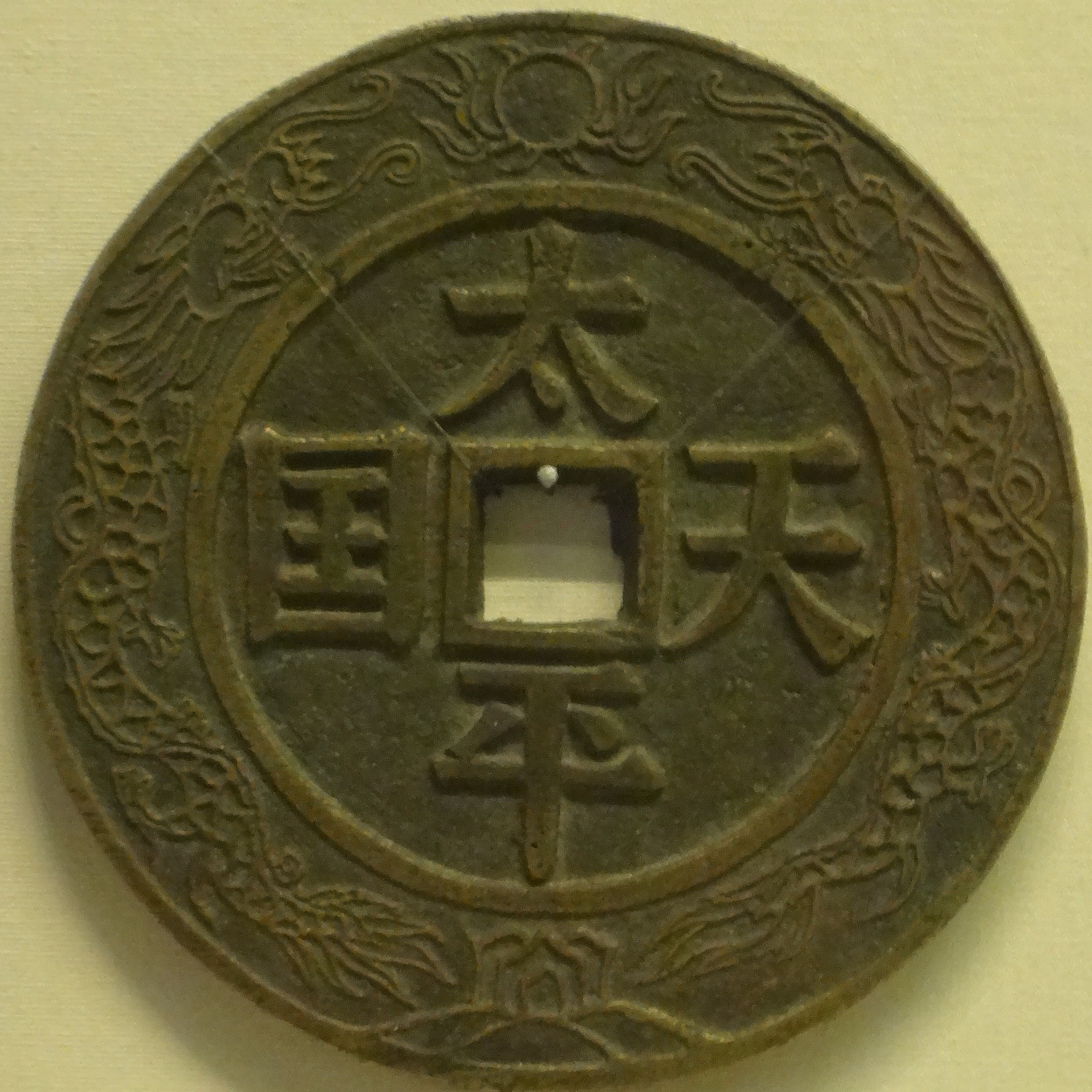
A vault protector coin of the Taiping Heavenly Kingdom

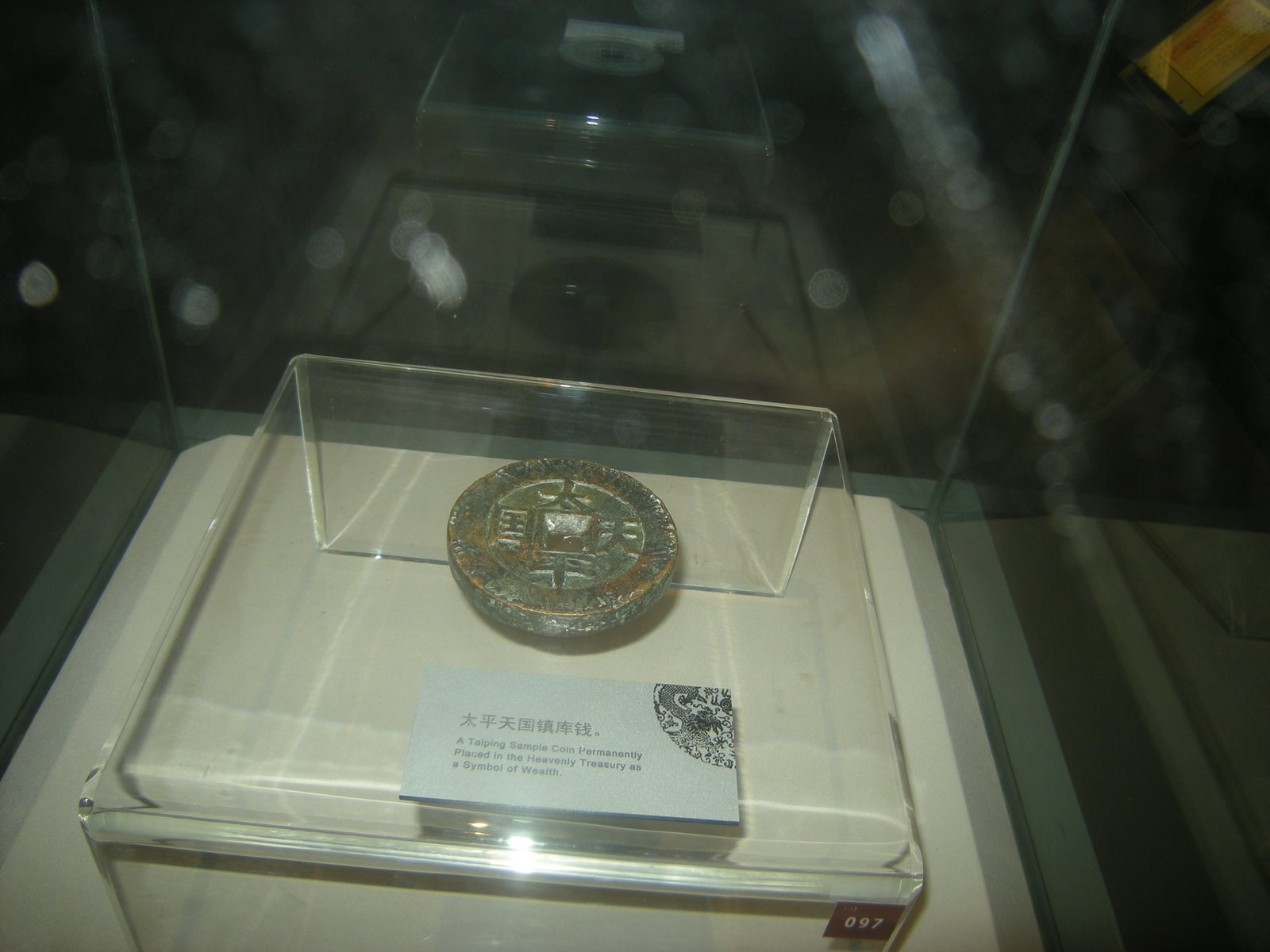
A vault protector coin of the Taiping Heavenly Kingdom on display at the Taiping Heavenly Kingdom History Museum in Nanjing

== Vietnam ==
During the Nguyễn dynasty period in Vietnam large coins were kept in the vaults of all provincial treasures and especially in the imperial vault in the capital city of Huế. These large coins often had auspicious inscriptions on them or poetry that promotes Confucian virtues.
