= Yueyatang congshu =

Qing collectaneum

Yueya tang congshu 粤雅堂丛书

Yueyatang congshu (simplified Chinese: 粤雅堂丛书; traditional Chinese: 粵雅堂叢書; Wade–Giles: Yüeh-ya t'ang ts'ung-shu "Collectanea of the Elegant Study of Canton") is a major collectaneum (Chin. congshu) of the Qing dynasty, financed by Wu Chongyao (伍崇曜, 1810–1863), bibliophile and proprietor of the Ewo Hong, one of the Thirteen Hongs of Canton. It was named after his library Yueyatang (粤雅堂). The actual editorial work was carried out by the scholar Tan Ying (谭莹; 1800-1871), whom Wu patronized.

It was published in three series (bian 編) and 30 collections (ji 集) that includes according to Chinaknowledge 208 books with a length of 1,289 juan. It includes works mainly from the Tang to Qing periods, covering classics, philology, history, geography, epigraphy, bibliography, and literature. Each text is accompanied by a colophon giving the author’s biography and an assessment of the work. Though attributed to Wu or his son Wu Shaotang (伍绍棠), these were written by Tan Ying. Under the name of Wu were published also three other collectanea, including the Lingnan yishu (岭南遗书).

The Yueyatang congshu preserves many rare texts and corrects errors found in the Siku Quanshu and Yongle Dadian.

The Hanyu da zidian, for example, makes frequent use of its editions.

== See also ==
- Tan Ying (ECCP)

== Bibliography ==
- Hiromu Momose [百瀨弘]: “Wu Ch’ung-yüeh”, in: ECCP (Arthur W. Hummel, Sr., ed.)
