= Taiping Heavenly Kingdom History Museum =

Museum in Nanjing, China

- 太平天国历史博物馆
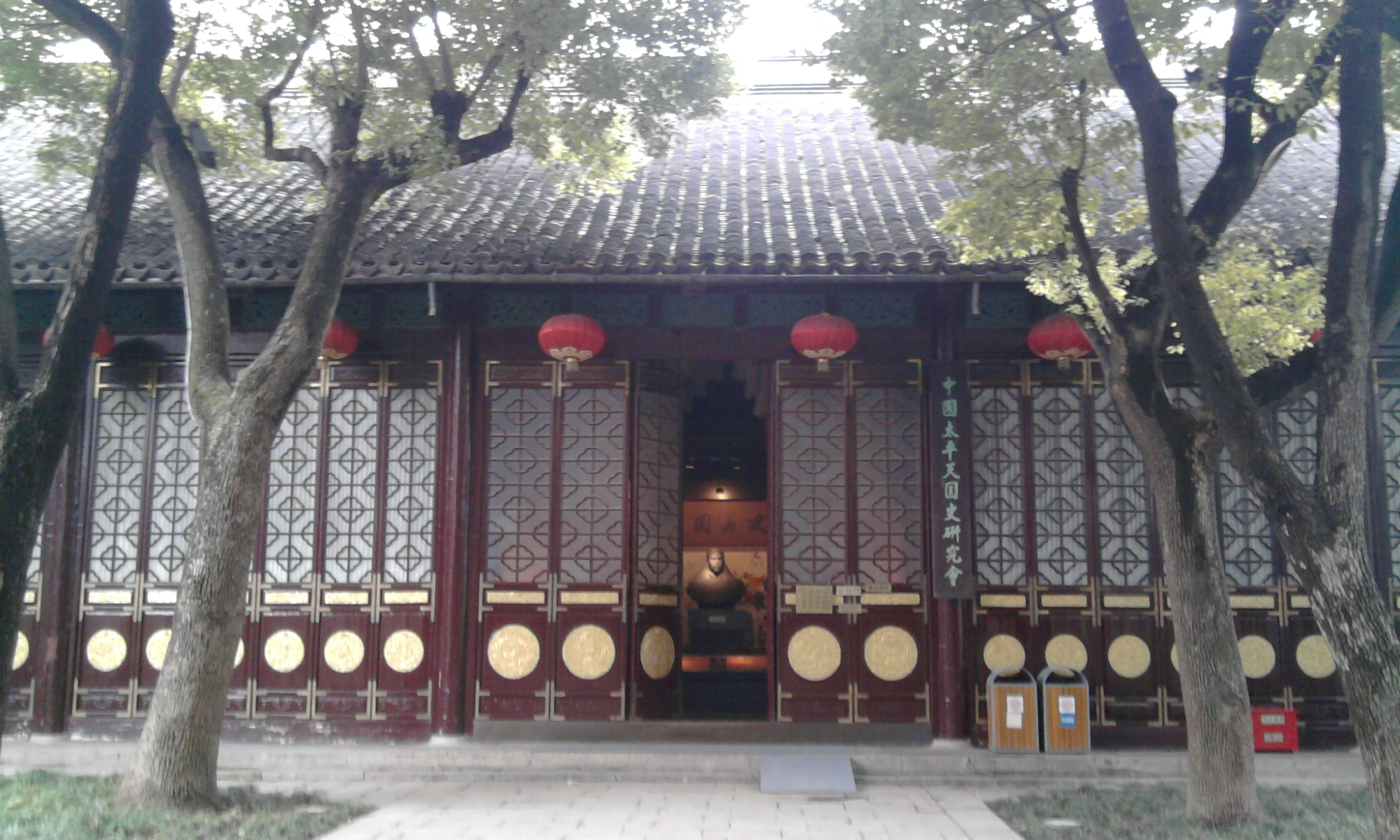
- Location: 208 West Zhanyuan Road 208 (南京夫子庙西瞻园路208号)
- Coordinates: 32°1′16.41″N 118°46′0.63″E

The Taiping Kingdom History Museum (Chinese: 太平天国历史博物馆) is a museum dedicated to artifacts from the Taiping Rebellion (1851–1864). It is located on the grounds of the Zhan Yuan Garden, a historical garden in Nanjing, China.

== History ==
The garden that surrounds the museum was once "Enthusiasm Garden" or "Zhan Garden" of the first ruler of the Ming Dynasty, Hongwu (1328-1398). In 1853, it became the residence of Yang Xiuqing, a military leader in the Taiping Rebellion. During the rebellion, Nanjing was captured by the rebels and used as its headquarters until 1864, when Qing forces took the city in the Third Battle of Nanjing.

== Museum ==
In 1958, it became the site of the current museum. The museum has artifacts from the rebellion, including: Taiping currency, weapons, uniforms, and documents about the Taiping Heavenly Kingdom ideology, which was based upon an idiosyncratic version of Christianity. Hong Xiuquan believed he was Christ's younger brother, ordered by God to exterminate China's Manchu rulers, whom he decried as demons.

== Gallery ==
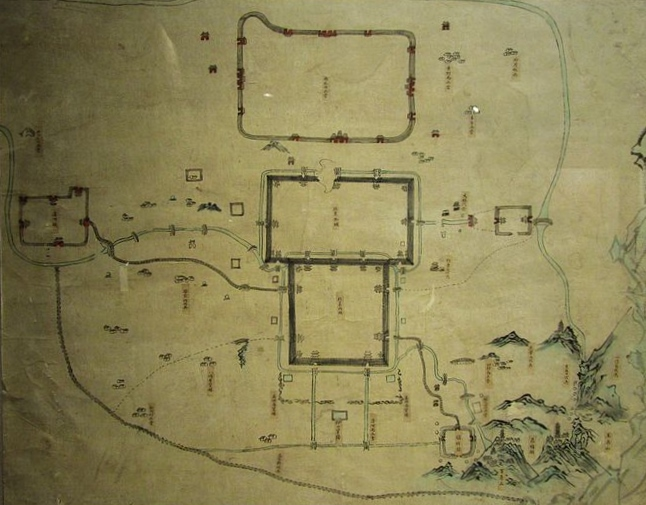
A map showing the defense of Beijing during the Period of the Taiping Heavenly Kingdom

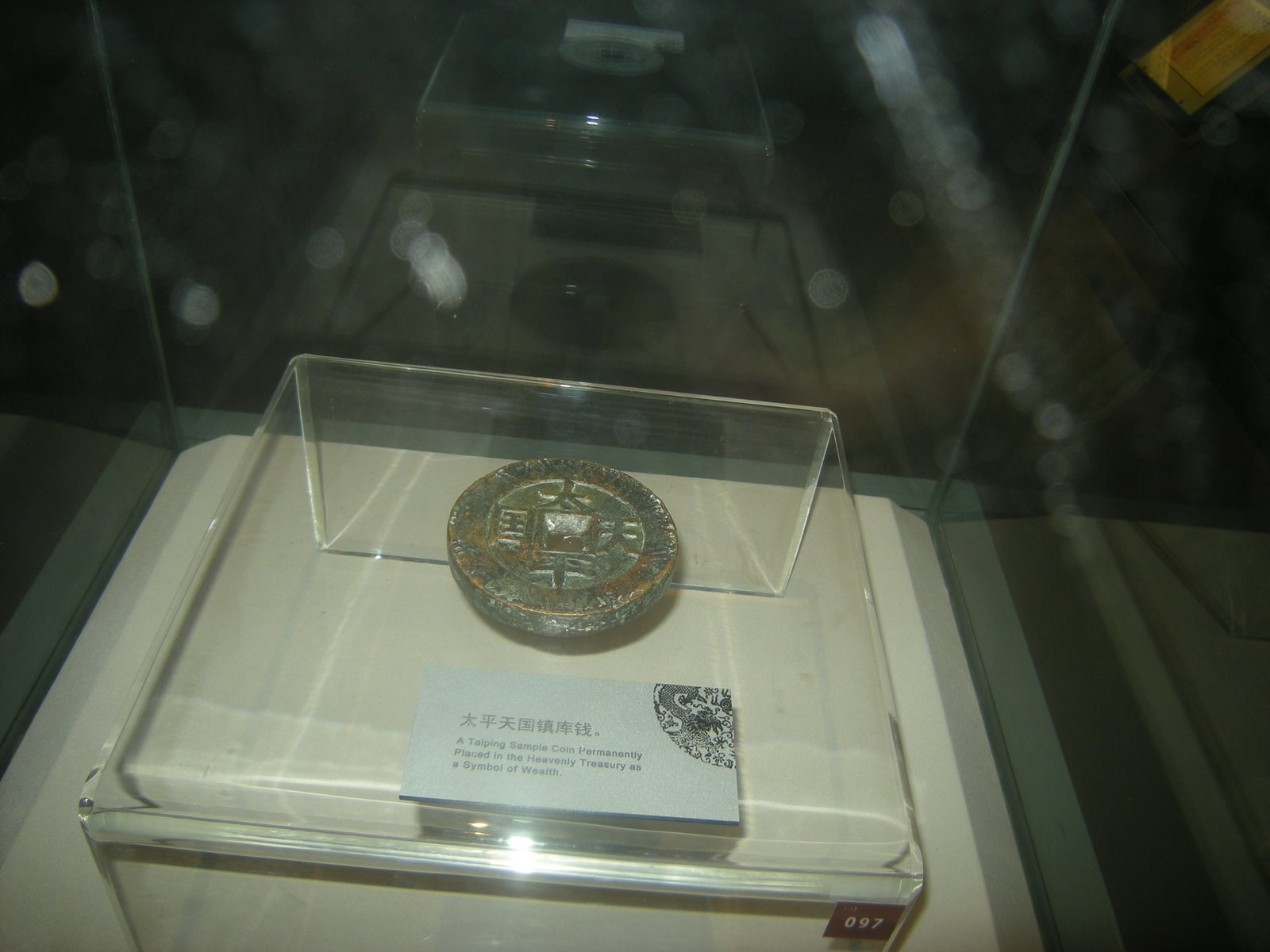
The Coin of Heavenly Kingdom of Great Peace

== See also ==
- List of museums in China
