= Zhong Rong =

Zhong Rong (Chinese: 鍾嶸; ca. 468–518) was a scholar of Chinese traditional poetics who lived during Southern Dynasties. His major work was titled Shiping 詩評 (Criticism of Poetry) which was renamed Shipin 詩品 (Ranking Poetry) in the Northern Song dynasty. This slim volume is the earliest known which aims to evaluate Chinese poets and their poetry. Its introduction presents a poetic theory which connected poetry with the concept of "qi".

Zhong Rong wrote that the more philosophical poems written during the reign of Emperor Huai of Jin overemphasized the lofty ideas of the Yellow Emperor and Laozi resulted in "bland and tasteless" poetry.
