= Ding Fubao =

Chinese Buddhist scholar (1874–1952)

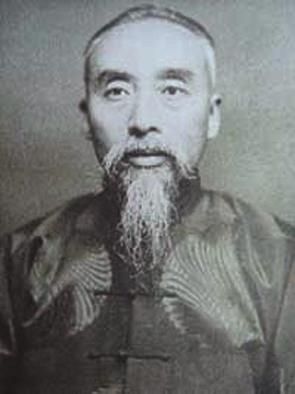
Image of Portrait of Ding Fubao

Ding Fubao (Chinese: 丁福保; 22 June 1874 – 28 November 1952) was a medical doctor, and noted Chinese scholar, who worked on Buddhist subjects, known for his authoritative work, A Dictionary of Buddhist Terms, which took 8 years to write and contained more than 30,000 entries; the Shuowen jiezi, and numismatics.

Ding was a key figure in the world of Chinese numismatics, and was President of the China Numismatic Society (Zhongguo quanbi xueshe 中國泉幣學社) from 1940. He was also known as Ding Zhonggu 丁仲祜 and 丁仲估.

== Publications (on numismatics) ==
- Quanzhi jinghua lu 泉志精華錄 (1936)
- Guqianxue 古錢學
- Gu qian shi yong tan 古錢實用譚 (1936)
- Gu qian dacidian 古錢大辭典 (1938)
- Guqian dacidian shiyi 古錢大辭典拾遺 (1939)
- Gu quan (qian) xue gangyao 古泉(錢)剛要 (1940)
- Guquan zaji 古泉雜記 (1933)
- Lidai guqian tushou 歷代古錢圖說 (1940)
- Zi cha guoyuan liang wen gu xi zhushou quan tie 子槎果園兩翁古稀祝壽泉帖
