= Bullet money =

Historical bullet-shaped coinage of Thailand

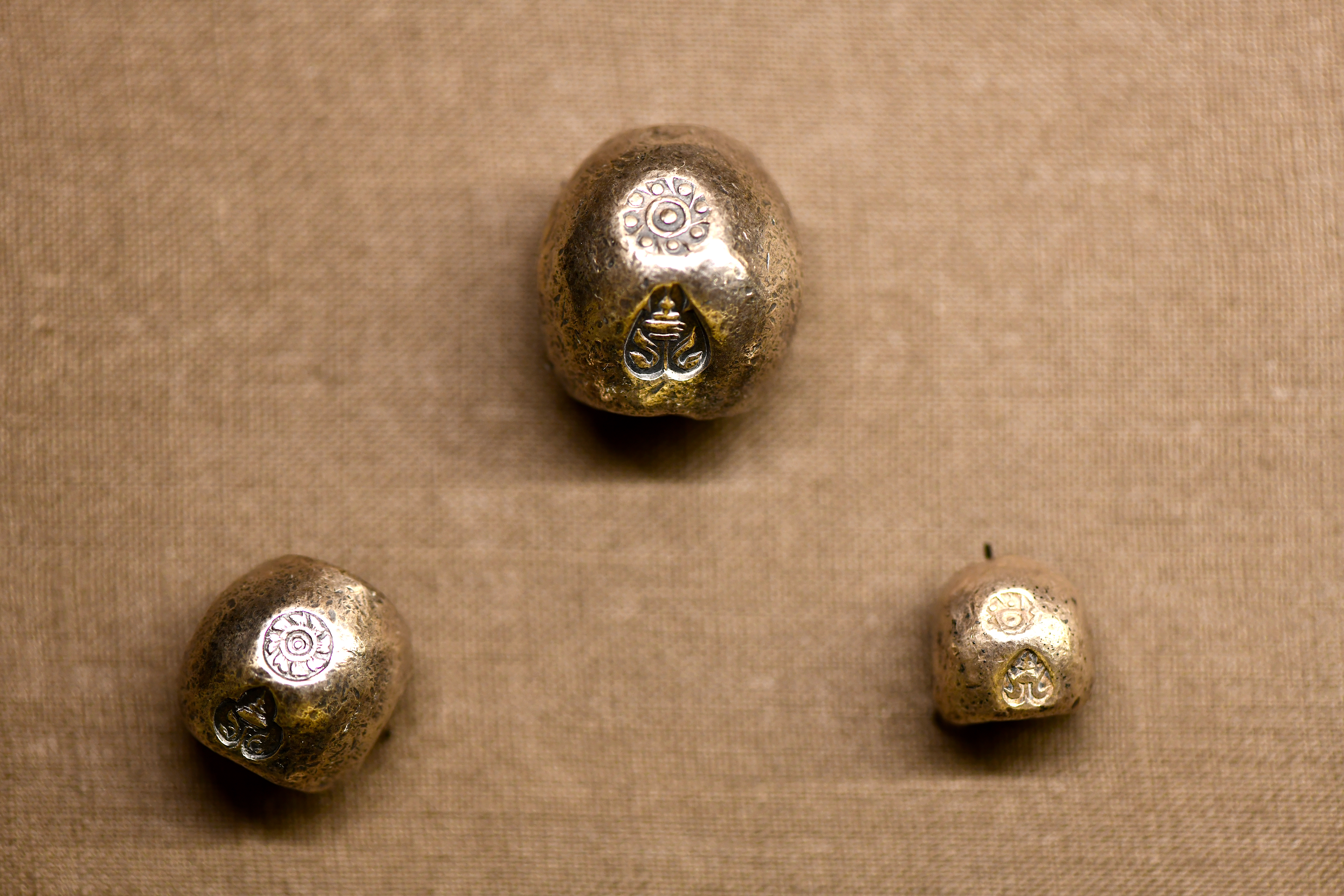
Phot duang coins

Bullet money or bullet coins, known in Thai as phot duang (also spelled pod duang; Thai: พดด้วง, pronounced [pʰót.dûaŋ]), were a type of coinage historically used in Siam (now Thailand) and its predecessor kingdoms. They were almost exclusively made of silver, in the form of a bar bent into a roundish shape, and stamped with certain marks. Phot duang were issued according to the baht system of weights, known among Westerners as the tical, which is the basis of the modern Thai currency. Their earliest common use is from the Sukhothai Kingdom (13th–15th centuries), and they were used by Ayutthaya and its successor kingdoms Thonburi and Rattanakosin up until 27 October 1904, when their use was discontinued in favour of flat coinage.

== Production in Siam ==
The standard equipment used to produce ancient Thai coins (Phod Duang) includes:

1. Pure silver, approximately 90-95%
2. A silver weighing scale
3. Scissors for cutting silver scraps
4. Clam shells for holding silver scraps
5. Melting pots of various sizes
6. Metal tongs for placing and removing silver scraps from the furnace
7. Wooden molds with an oval-shaped indentation in the center, of various sizes
8. A square piece of cheesecloth for placing on the indentation of the wooden mold
9. Cold water
10. Wooden sticks with flat ends, of various sizes, for pressing the cheesecloth against the indentation of the wooden mold and for tapping and shaping the silver scraps in the center of the mold
11. A charcoal bellows
12. Charcoal tongs for tapping and holding charcoal in the mold
13. Iron pans with indentations of various sizes for placing the shaped silver ingots.
14. Steel hammers of various sizes
15. Double-edged chisels of various sizes
16. Wooden tray with handle and compartments for placing bullet coins. The trays are shaped like solid metal, with 4 coins per compartment, in various sizes, holding 12, 20, 40, and 80 coins for easy counting.
17. Large round wooden bucket for storing the finished bullet coins
18. Elephant leg bones, hollowed out in various sizes for placing the bullet coins while stamping, as they are very heavy, do not move, are flexible, and do not break easily.
19. Steel stamping dies for stamping the bullet coins.

=== Process ===
The coin production team consists of 4 people, with one team leader. Each person has the following duties:

- The first person lights the fire in the furnace and uses a bellows to make it blaze.
- The second person uses charcoal tongs to distribute the embers evenly.
- The third person cuts the prepared silver scraps with scissors, places them in a weighed clam shell, and weighs it on a scale. Once the desired weight is reached (e.g., one baht, one fuang, etc.), all the silver scraps from the clam shell are poured into the mold.
- The fourth person uses another pair of tongs to place the mold in the furnace and uses the tongs to distribute the charcoal evenly to heat the mold.

The first person uses bellows to increase the heat in the furnace until all the silver inside the mold melts completely.

The second person then uses tongs to lift the mold from the furnace and pours the molten silver into a wooden mold filled almost to the brim with water. A white cloth is placed over the top of the mold.

Meanwhile, the third person prepares the wooden mold by filling it with water and positioning the white cloth properly. After the silver is poured in, this person uses a pointed wooden stick to smooth the molten silver inside the mold. Once the silver hardens, the cloth is lifted away. The silver forms an egg-like lump with a rounded bottom resembling the back of a seashell. The piece is then passed to the fourth person.

The fourth person shapes the silver using a double-edged chisel and an iron hammer. The two ends are folded together, creating one or two marks depending on the historical period, until the piece takes the final form of a silver coin. A skilled craftsman can complete a coin in as few as five hammer strikes. The finished coin is then placed onto a prepared wooden tray.

=== Results ===
The stamping of the national seal, the royal seal, and the imprint of rice grains were done using prepared steel dies. The top and front sides were struck with an iron hammer on specially drilled indentations on a large, long elephant leg bone, approximately 5 feet long. Skilled craftsmen produced 2,400 baht worth of bullet money per day. During the reign of King Rama IV, there were as many as 1010 sets of craftsmen, or 10 furnaces, producing 2,400 pieces per day. Even in 1857, when production increased to 80 to 90 pieces per day (6,400-7,200 baht), it was still not enough to meet the demand for circulation.

== Characteristics of bullet coins ==
Bullet coins are generally round in shape, though their exact appearance depends on the length of the legs and the sharpness of the ends. Hammer marks created when folding the legs together can help identify the era or period in which the coin was made. The opening between the legs may be large, small, or completely closed.

Bullet coins have six distinct sides:

- Top side – stamped with the national or kingdom seal.
- Front side – stamped with the reign seal.
- Base of the legs – marked with a notch or a grain-of-rice stamp.
- Back side – usually left blank.
- Right and left sides – located along the folded legs, showing hammer marks that may appear as one or two lines depending on the period.
- Bottom side – the ends of the legs, often stamped with a single grain-of-rice mark on coins bearing this symbol.

== Decline ==
Once the Royal Mint was established and coin production was completed in 1860, the production of bullet money for circulation was discontinued. However, commemorative bullet money continued to be produced on several occasions. Bullet money already in circulation remained in use until King Chulalongkorn ordered the Minister of the Treasury to issue an announcement on October 27, 1904, stating that:

“...the bullet money that has been widely circulated in the Kingdom from the Treasury at this time is easily counterfeited, causing the public to suffer losses.It is appropriate to discontinue the use of bullet money, and the Minister of the Treasury shall establish a rule for the discontinuation of bullet money. From October 28, 1904 onwards, all types of bullet money shall be discontinued.”

It was thereafter considered illegal currency, and no one was required to accept it as payment. Within one year from the date of the announcement, until October 26, 1905, officials throughout the Kingdom were authorized to accept bullet money from citizens in exchange for baht coins, for payment of taxes, or for any other form of government revenue. The Bangkok Customs Department and other officials responsible for collecting state revenue were also permitted to accept bullet money. In addition, the Bangkok Banknote Department could exchange bullet money for banknotes.

Large quantities of bullet money were delivered daily to the Royal Treasury, and officials were unable to process the exchanges quickly enough. As a result, the Minister of the Treasury issued another announcement on December 15, 1904, allowing companies, businesses, and reputable individuals to exchange bullet money in amounts of no less than 5,000 baht immediately without prior official inspection. A detailed examination would still be conducted later, but a contract had to be signed stating that if the money was found to be deficient, counterfeit, or excessive in amount, the exchanger would be fully responsible for compensating the difference.

The collection and exchange of bullet money into the Royal Treasury did not end as originally planned. It was later discovered that large amounts of bullet money still remained in public circulation. Therefore, on August 29, 1906, the Minister issued another announcement stating:

“...Regarding the announcement to accept bullet money until October 26, 1905, it has now been learned by His Majesty the King that a large amount of bullet money still remains with the people, as it was not exchanged in time, which is contrary to the public interest that requires the bullet money to be kept as fixed currency. By His Majesty's gracious grace, the Ministry of Finance is therefore ordered to accept bullet money from those who wish to exchange it any longer.”

Officials exchanged the bullet money for baht coins, deducting a discount for the cost of melting the silver, which would then be reused to mint additional baht coins for circulation. The Minister determined the exchange rate according to the market value of silver.

Even after this, the exchange of bullet money continued for some time until a final announcement abolished the practice entirely. Exchanges were permitted only until July 31, 1908, marking the complete end of bullet money as legal tender in Thailand after more than 600 years of use.

== Replacement ==
The shortage of bullet money became so severe that production could no longer meet demand. As a result, the government announced that foreign coins could be used for trade and for paying salaries to government officials. King Mongkut therefore considered producing modern Thai coins for domestic use. When British ambassador Sir John Bowring and his second-in-command Harry Smith Parkes arrived in Siam to sign a treaty of friendship, discussions regarding coin production also began. After the treaty was exchanged at the Royal Council Hall, the king expressed his wish to obtain a hand-operated coin-making machine since Siam did not yet have electricity. He also provided sample die designs for both the obverse and reverse sides of the proposed coins.

While waiting for the machinery to arrive, King Mongkut ordered the royal mint to produce coins by flattening sheets of silver, cutting them into circular pieces of the required size and weight, and then hammering them by hand. This process was known as the Hand-Hammering Method. A similar method had been used in England before 1662 during the reign of Charles II as hammered coinage.

Using this technique, gold and silver coins were produced in denominations such as one baht, salueng (¼ baht), fuang, and smaller units with serrated edges. However, production remained limited and the quality was inconsistent, so the method was eventually abandoned.

Around the same period, minting machinery arrived from England as a gift from Victoria in late 1857 (2400 BE). Two main coin designs were produced using this machinery. One featured the Chakra, the Royal Crown, and the Royal Seal on the obverse with a blank reverse, while another featured only the Royal Crown on the obverse. Both types carried the inscription:

“Bangkok”

Later, King Mongkut introduced a new series of coins made with manually operated machinery. These coins were exceptionally well crafted and were produced in five denominations, including 1 baht, ¼ baht, salueng, and fuang denominations. Coin collectors later referred to them as “tribute coins” because they were minted using machinery presented by Queen Victoria.

These coins were minted only during the Year of the Snake (1219 CS) and the Year of the Horse (1220 CS), corresponding to 1857–1858. Production included 30-baht coins, smaller denominations worth 10 chang and 10 tamlueng, and several gold coins. However, minting eventually ceased because production was too slow to meet demand. Their designs also differed from later standard machine-minted coins.

When the Royal Mint was formally established in 1860, a new generation of coins was produced featuring floral and wheel patterns with intricate silver borders. These coins were darker, thinner, but equal in weight to ordinary silver coins. Gold and silver examples were often distributed as gifts, presented to selected individuals, or given as alms to the public. They could also be exchanged for newly minted coins, demonstrating that they were officially recognized as legal currency.

The machinery used to produce these coins belonged to the milled coinage system, also known as machine-made coinage, and operated through a screw-press method using three manually operated machines.

- The first machine produced silver blanks by rolling silver sheets to a uniform thickness and cutting them into circular pieces.
- The second machine stamped the coin designs and seals. It is recorded that Harry Smith Parkes obtained a sample seal in 1856.
- The third machine created the raised edges around the coins.

Many surviving examples show signs of wear on the reverse side from circulation and use.

== Gallery ==
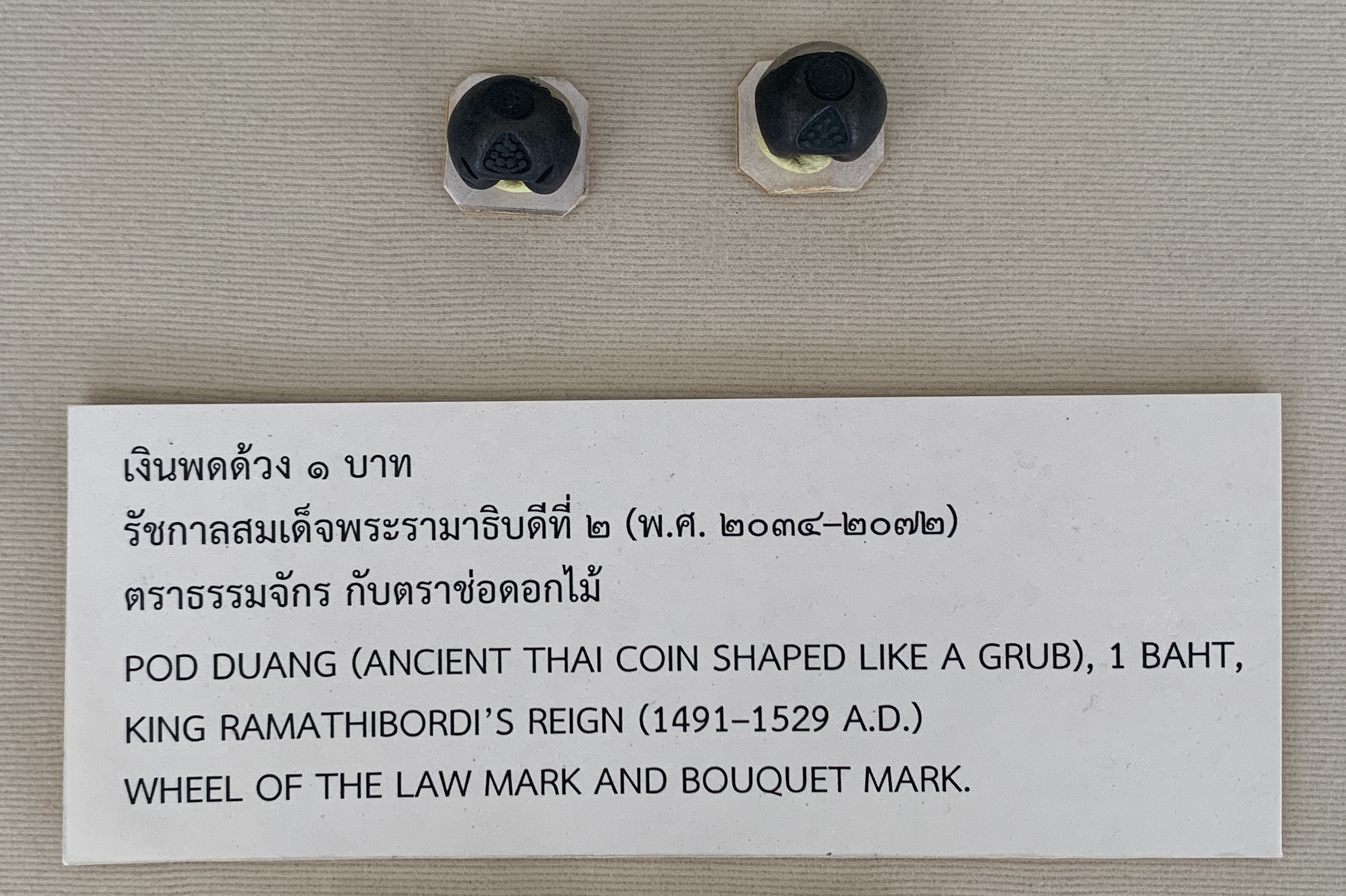
King Ramathibodi II (1491-1529)

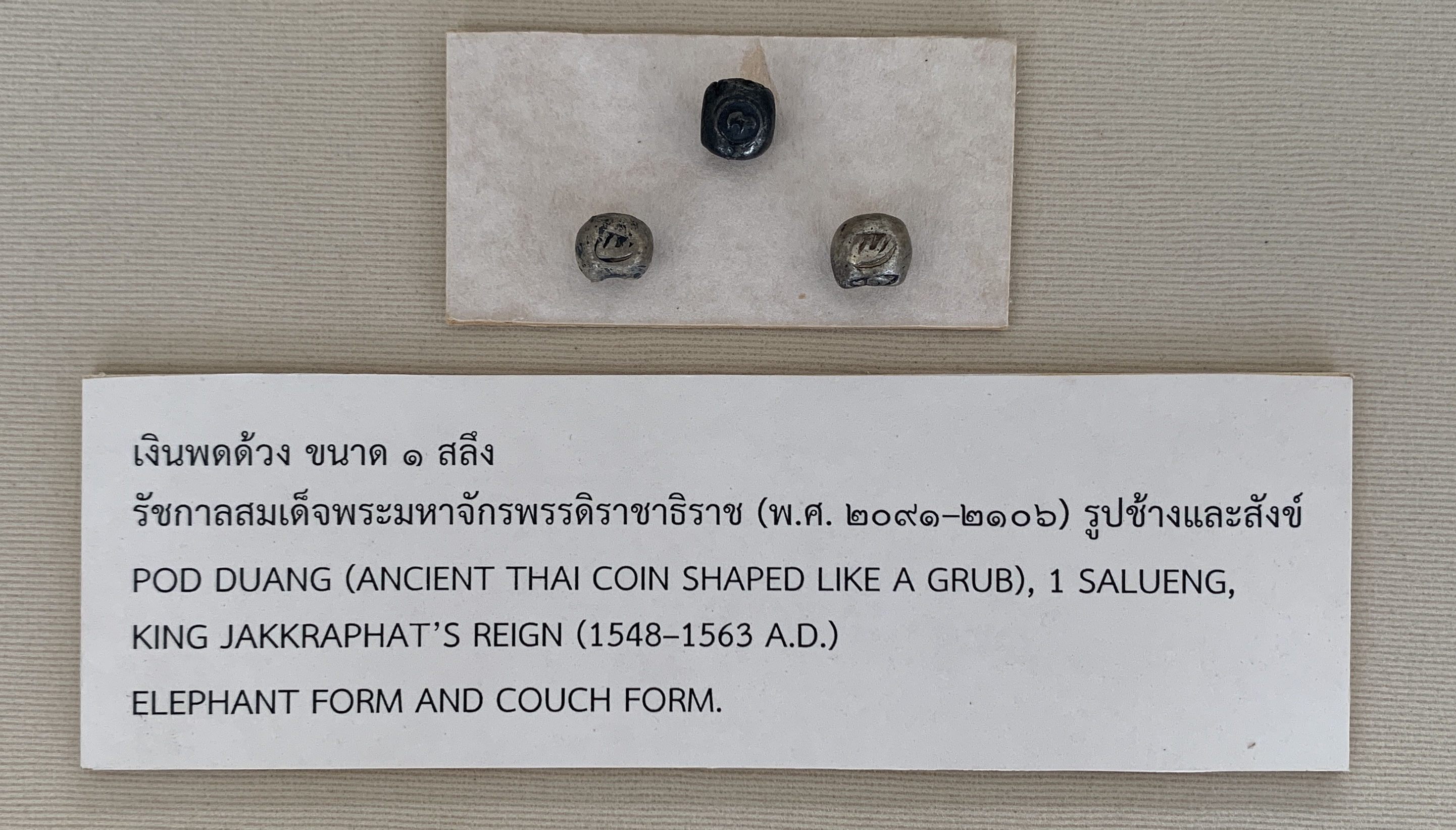
Maha Chakkraphat (1548-1569)

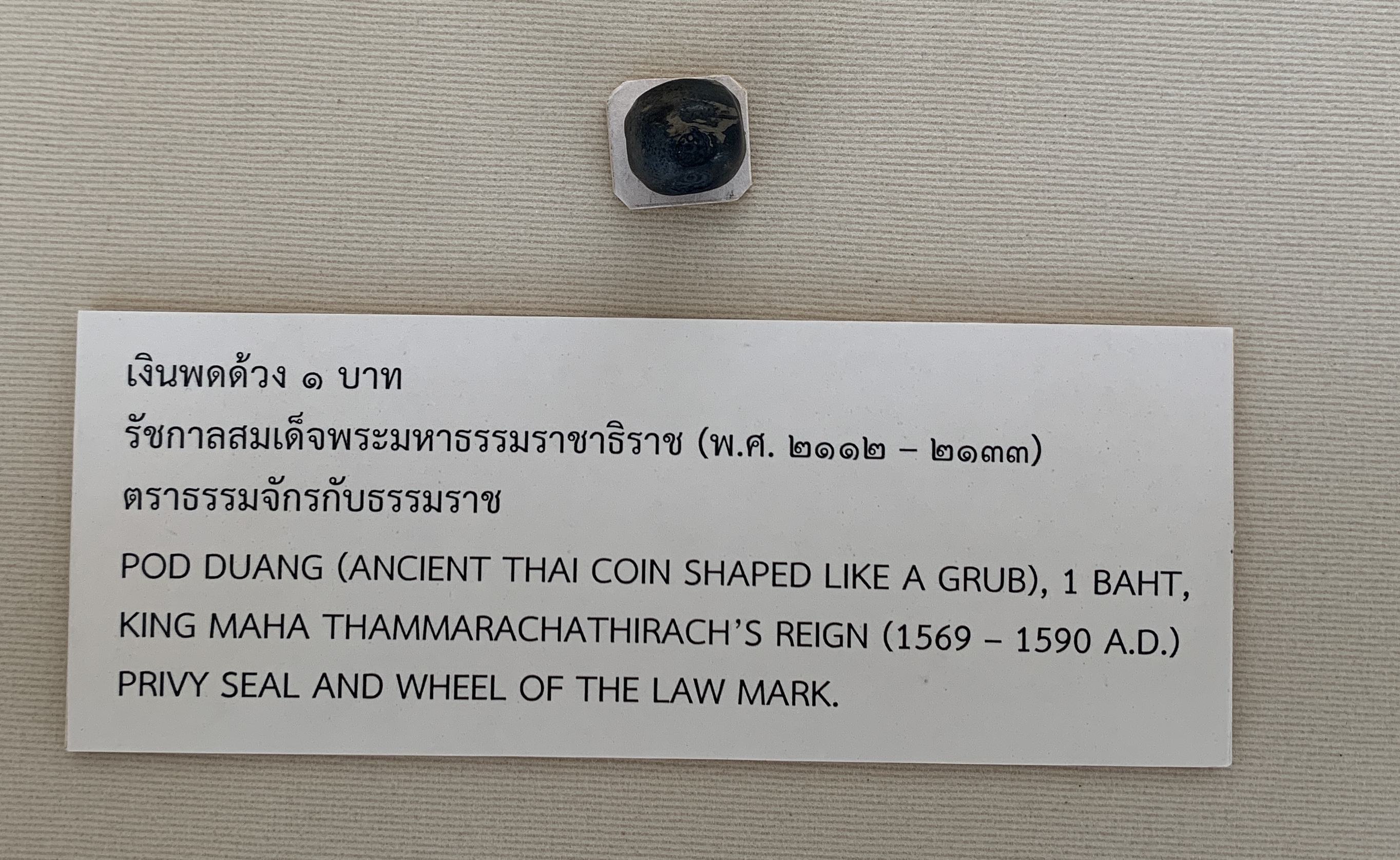
Maha Thammarachathirat (1569-1590)

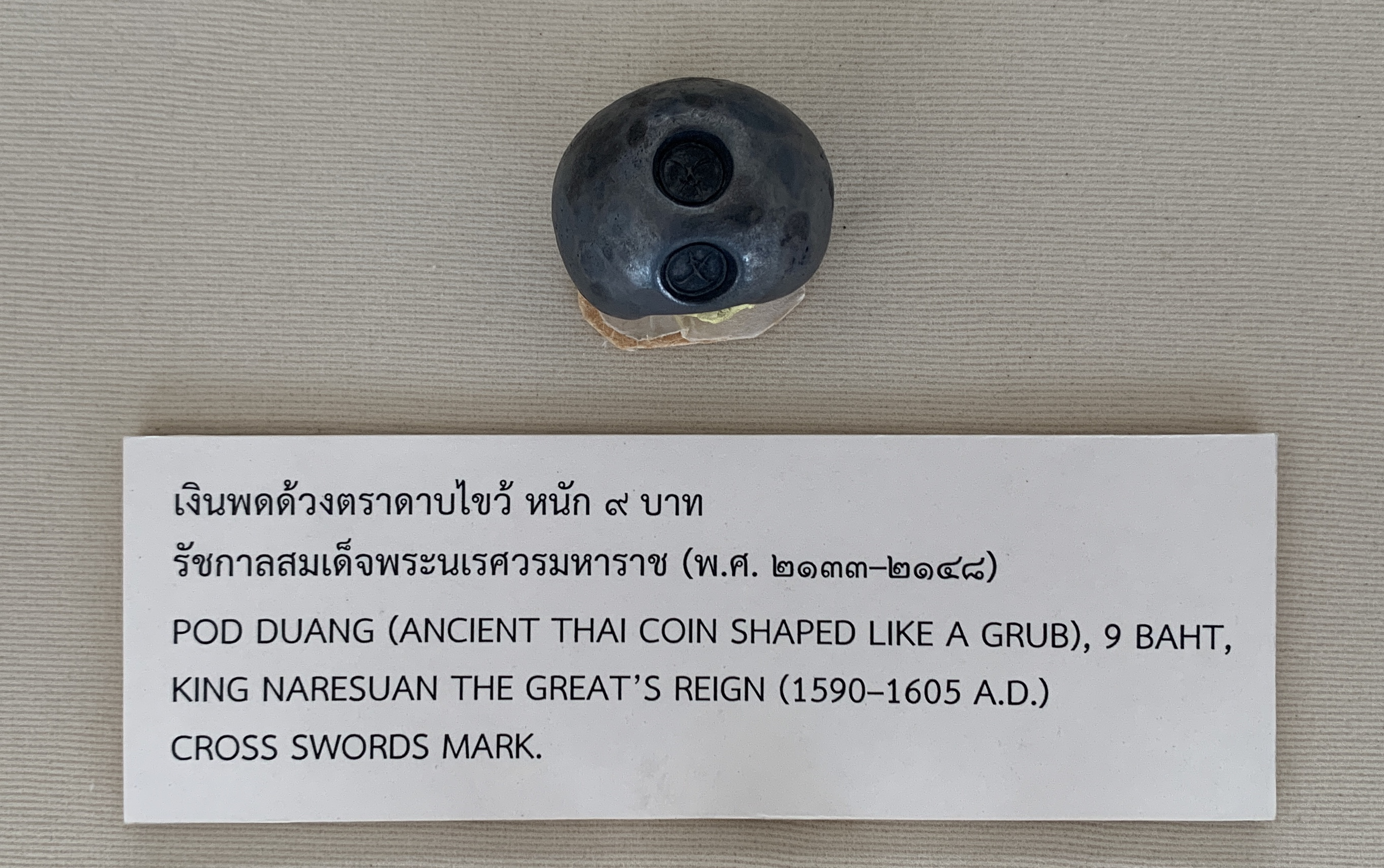
Naresuan (1590-1605)

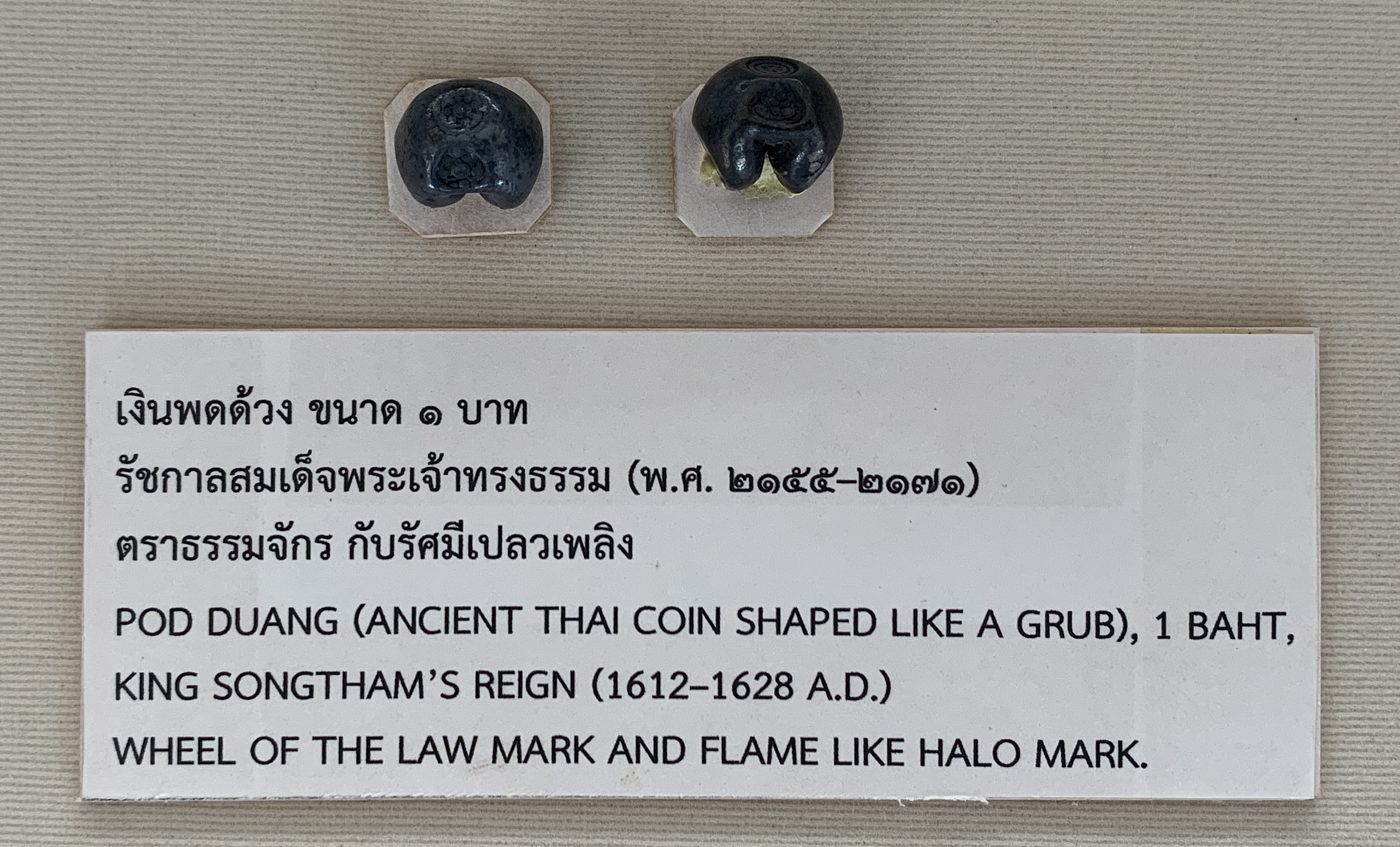
Songtham (1611-1628)

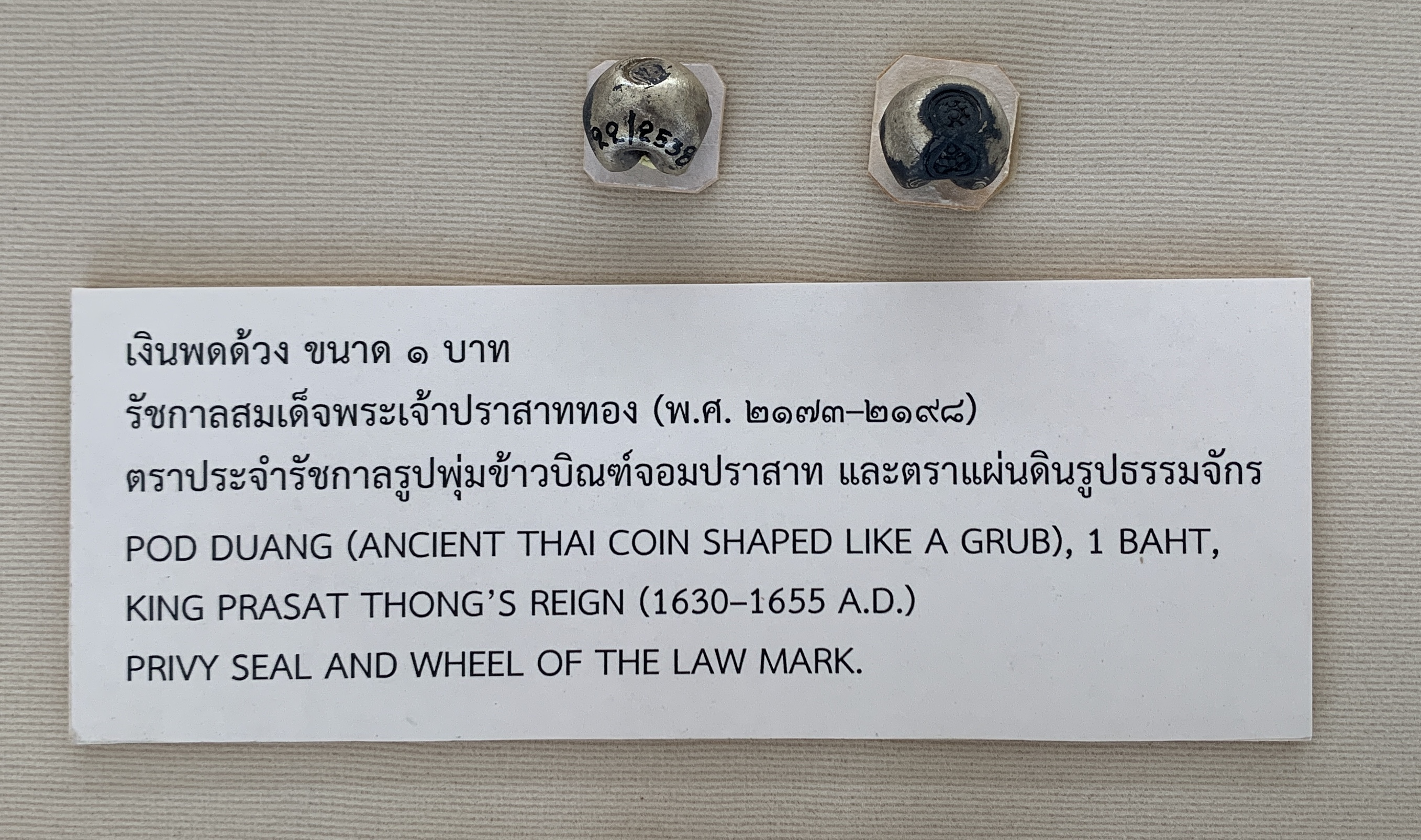
Prasat Thong (1629-1656)

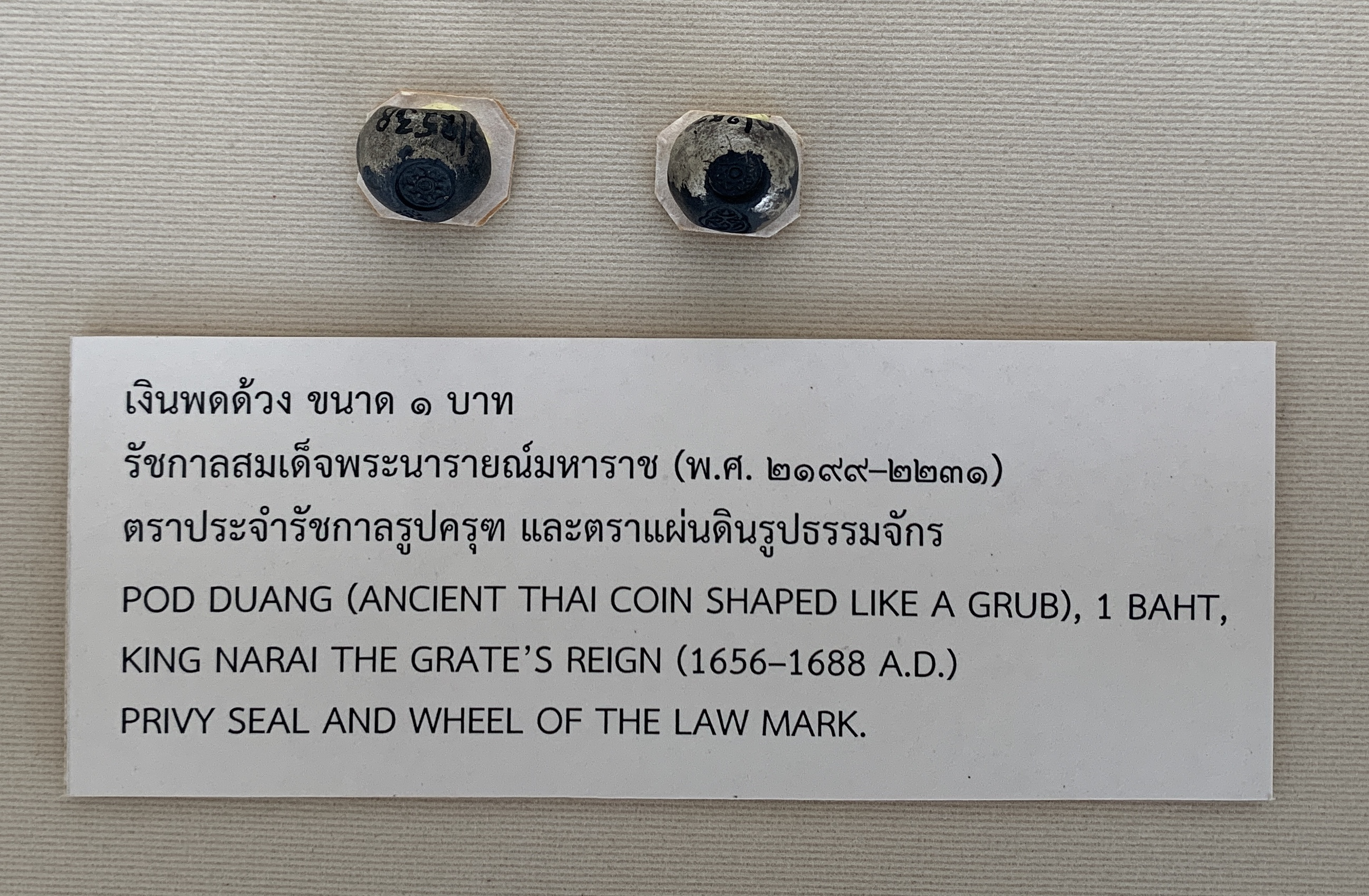
Narai (1656-1588)

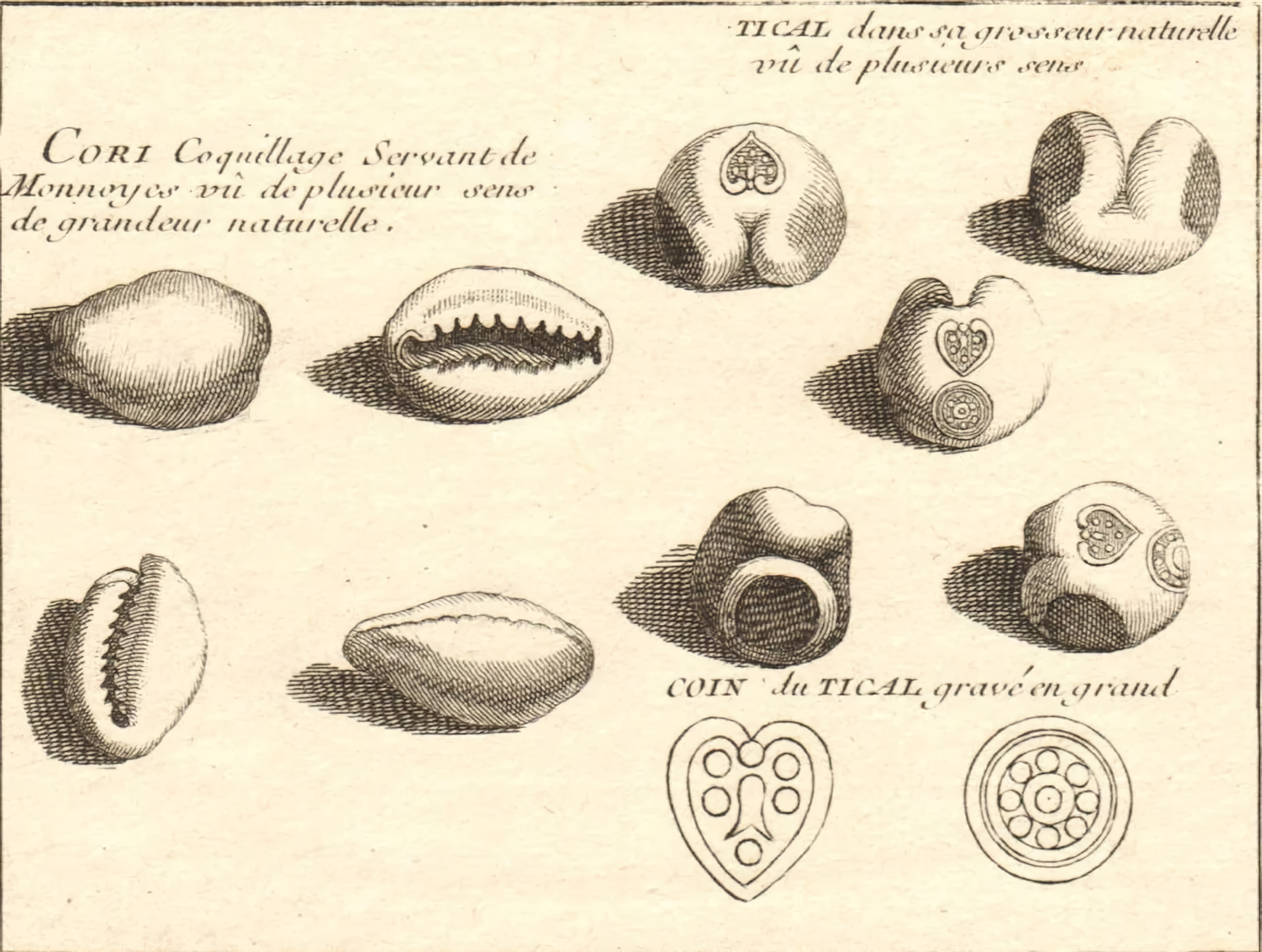
Cowrie and Tical Phot Duang money of Siam (1751)

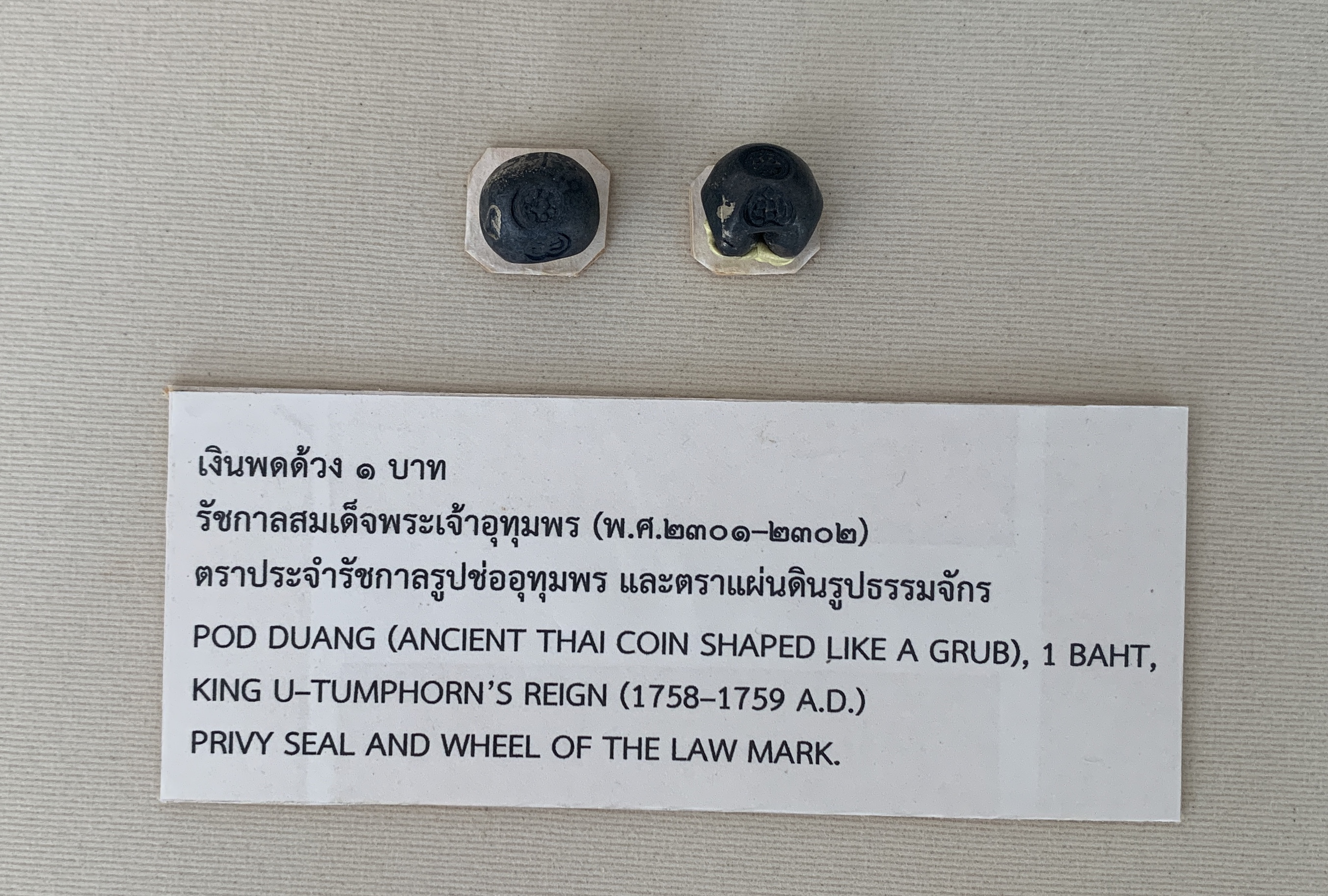
Uthumphon (1758)

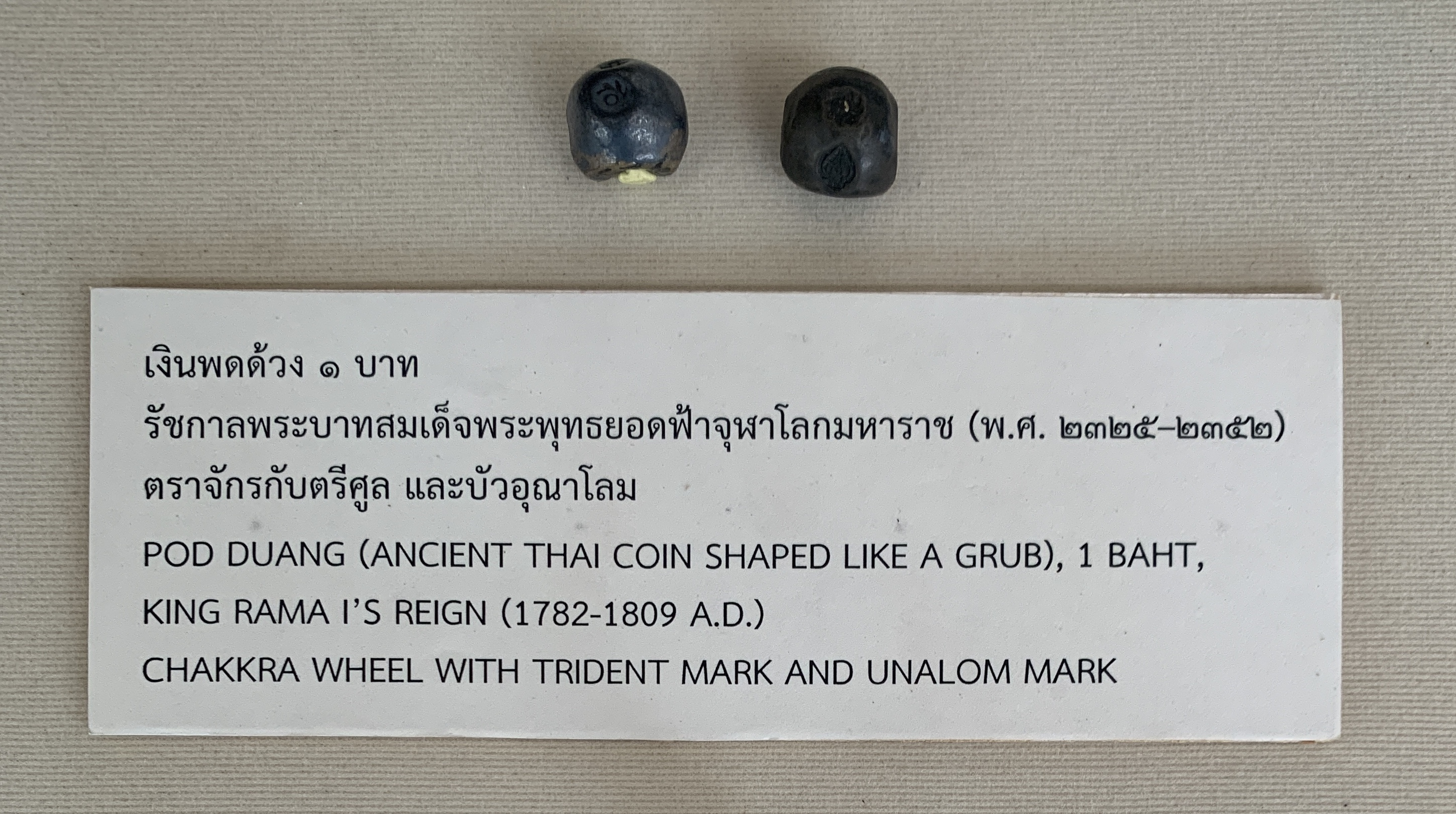
Rama I (1782-1809)

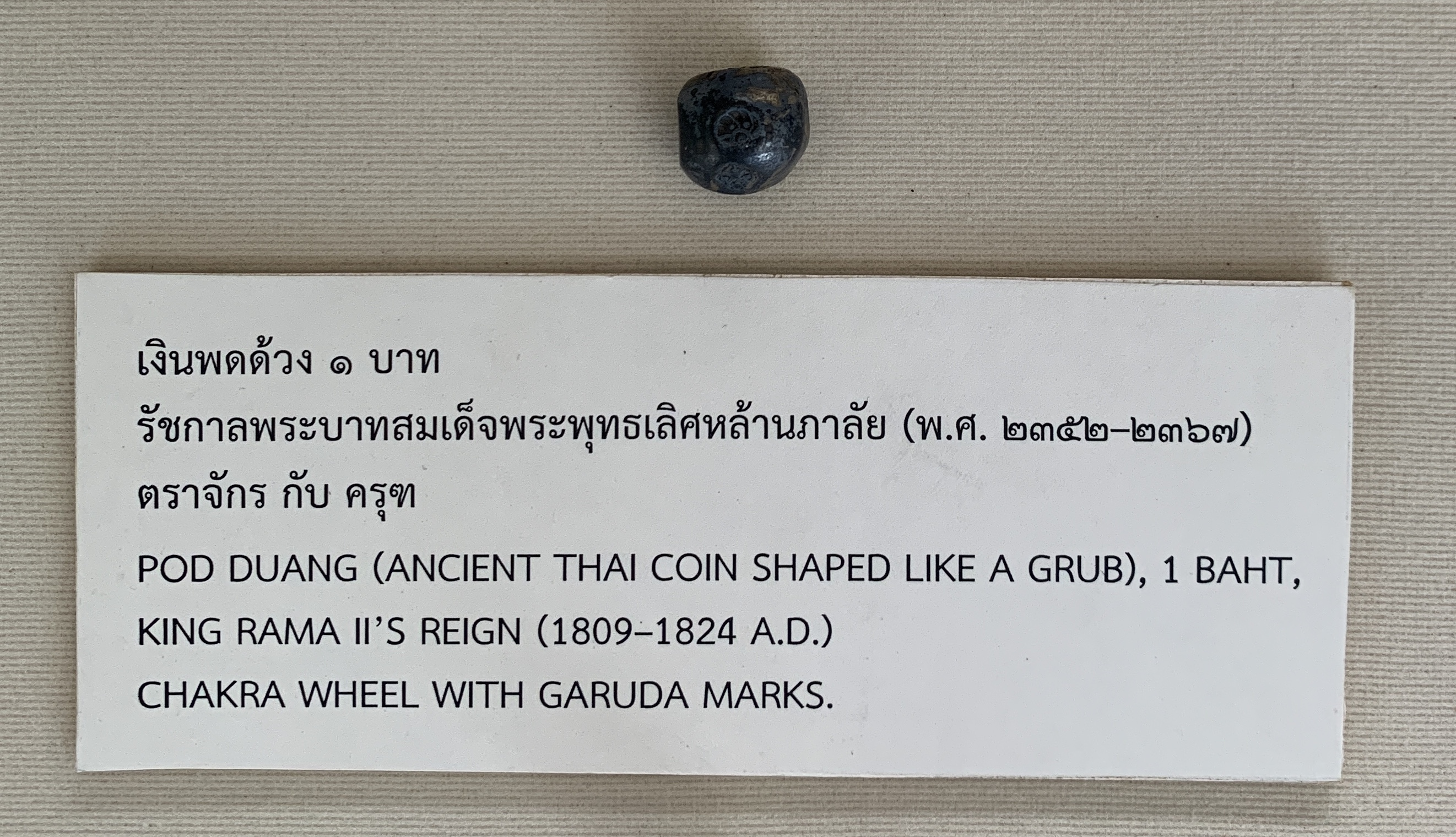
Rama II (1809-1824)

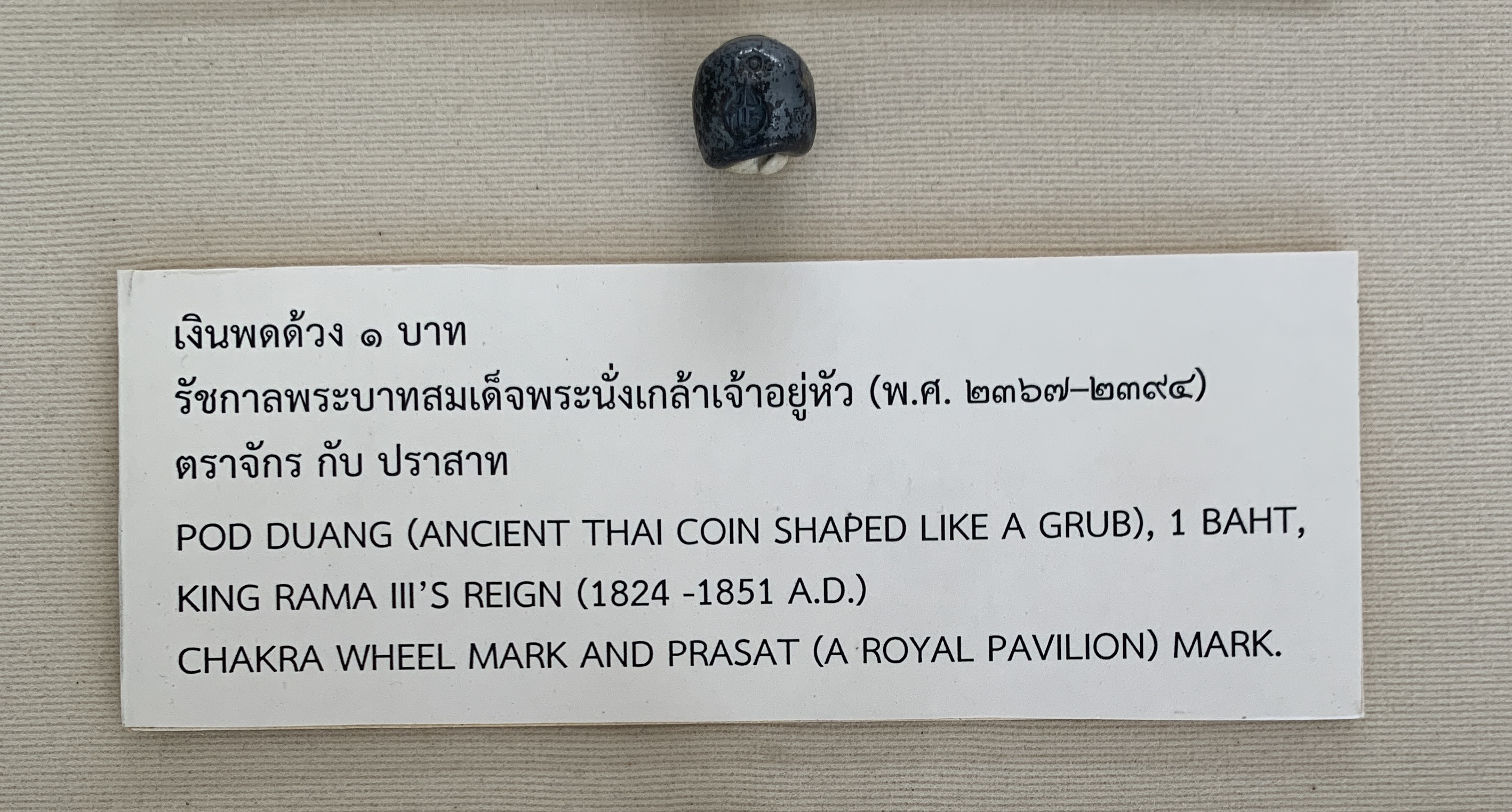
Rama III (1824-1851)

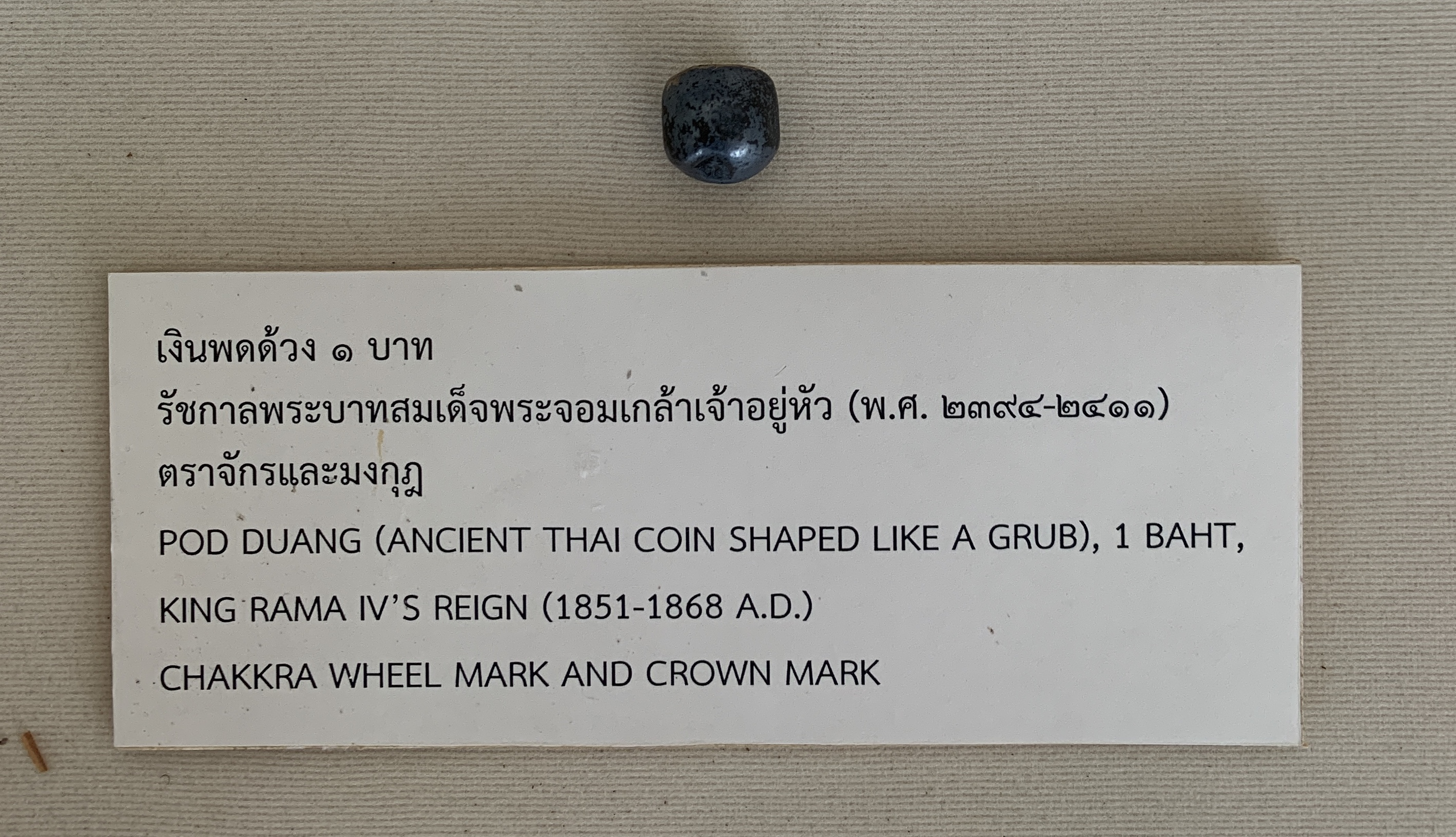
Rama IV (1851-1868)

== See also ==
- Lat money, a similar currency used in Lan Xang
- Piloncitos, used in the Philippines
- Axe money
- Knife money
- Spade money
