= Twenty-five-satang coin =

Thai currency unit

25 satang
- Thailand
- Value: 0.25 Thai baht
- Mass: 1.9 g
- Diameter: 16 mm
- Edge: Reeded
- Composition: 99% Fe; Cladding: 99% Cu
- Years of minting: 1860–present
- Catalog number: -

Obverse
- Design: King Vajiralongkorn
- Designer: Vudhichai Seangern

Reverse
- Design: Royal Monogram of King Vajiralongkorn
- Designer: Chaiyod Soontrapa

The Thailand twenty-five-satang coin (25 st. or 25 สต.) is a currency unit equivalent to one-fourth of a Thai baht. It is commonly called salueng (Thai: สลึง) by Thai speakers. Salueng is the name of a historical Thai measurement, equal to one quarter of a baht or 3.75 grams (0.132 oz).

Evolution of 25 satang

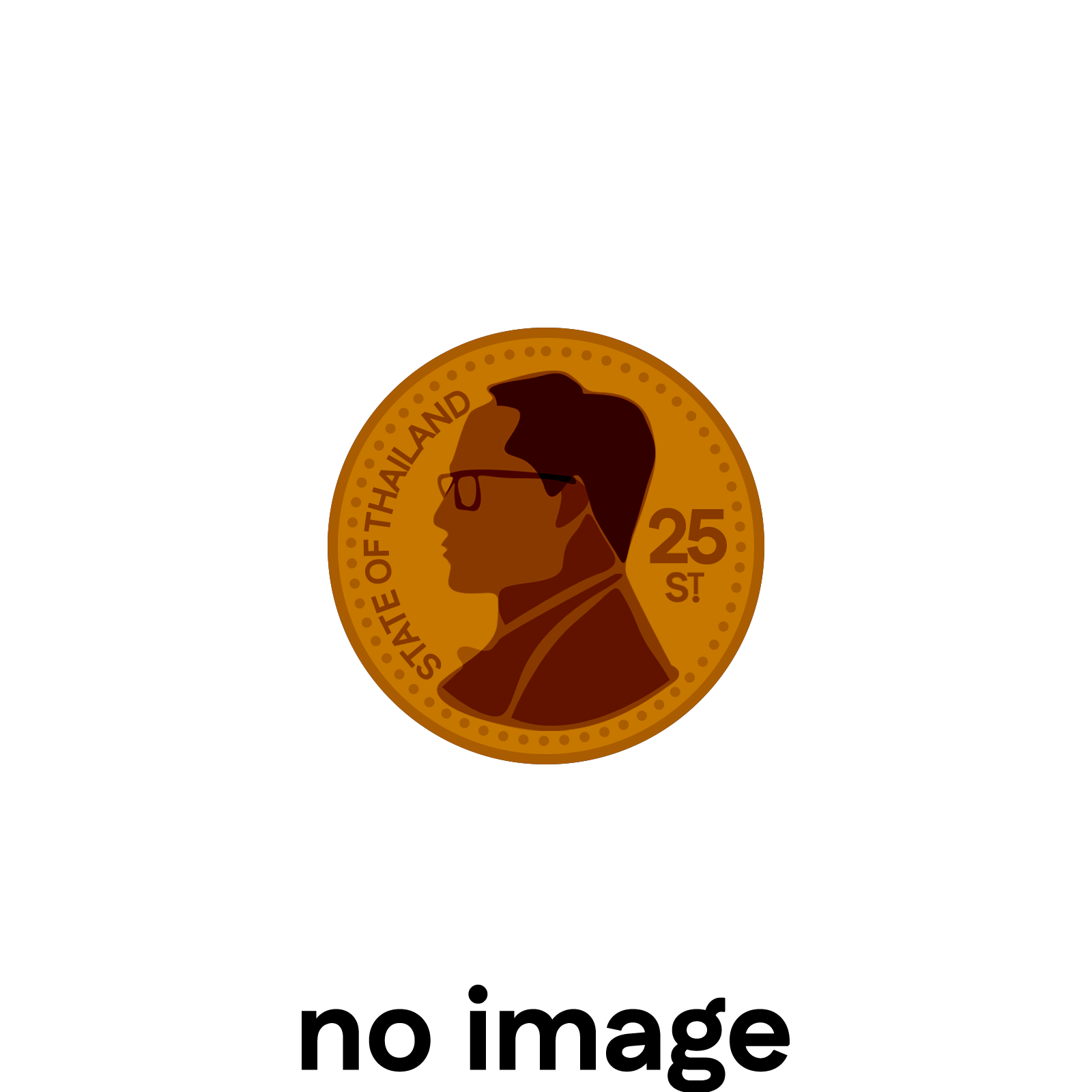
1987

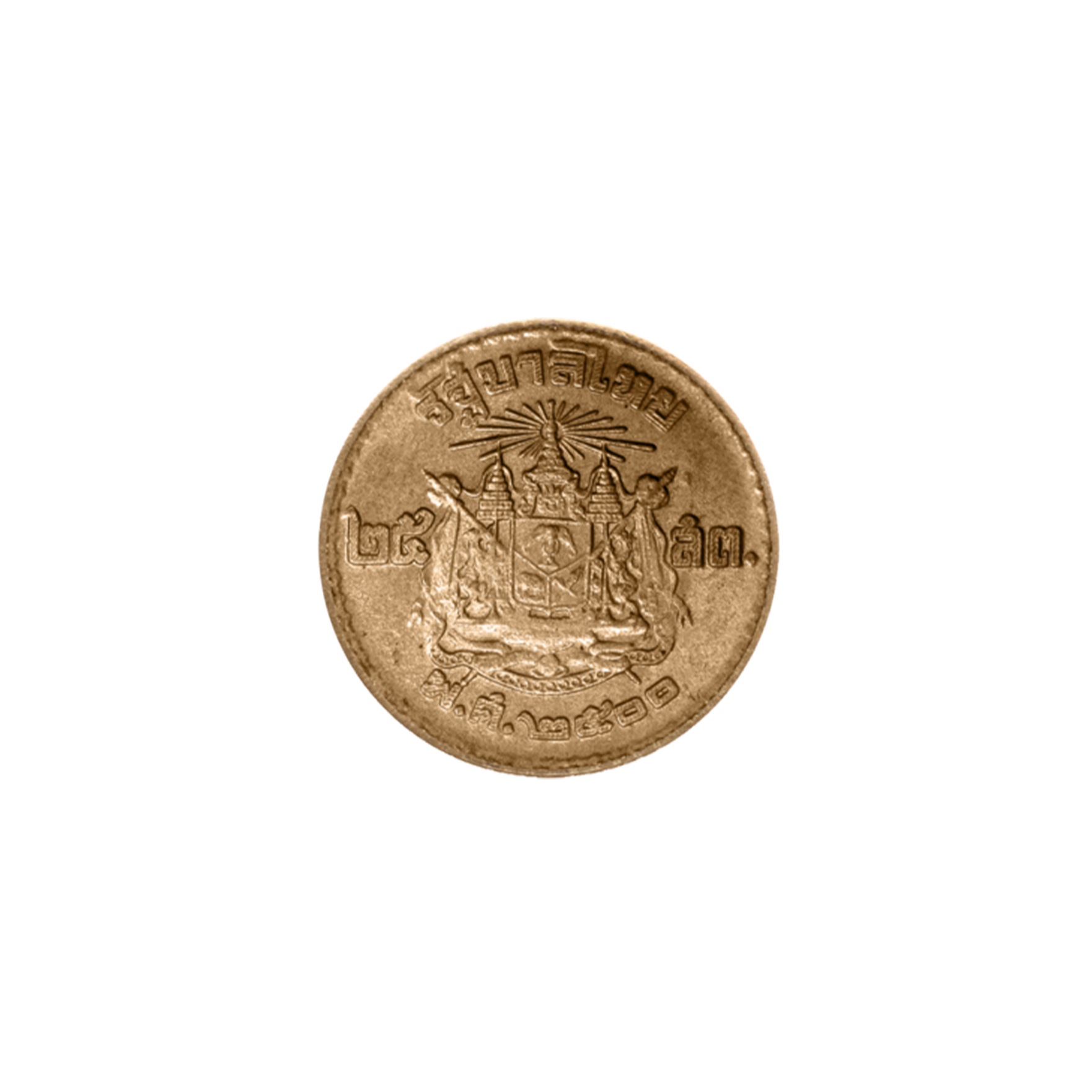
1950

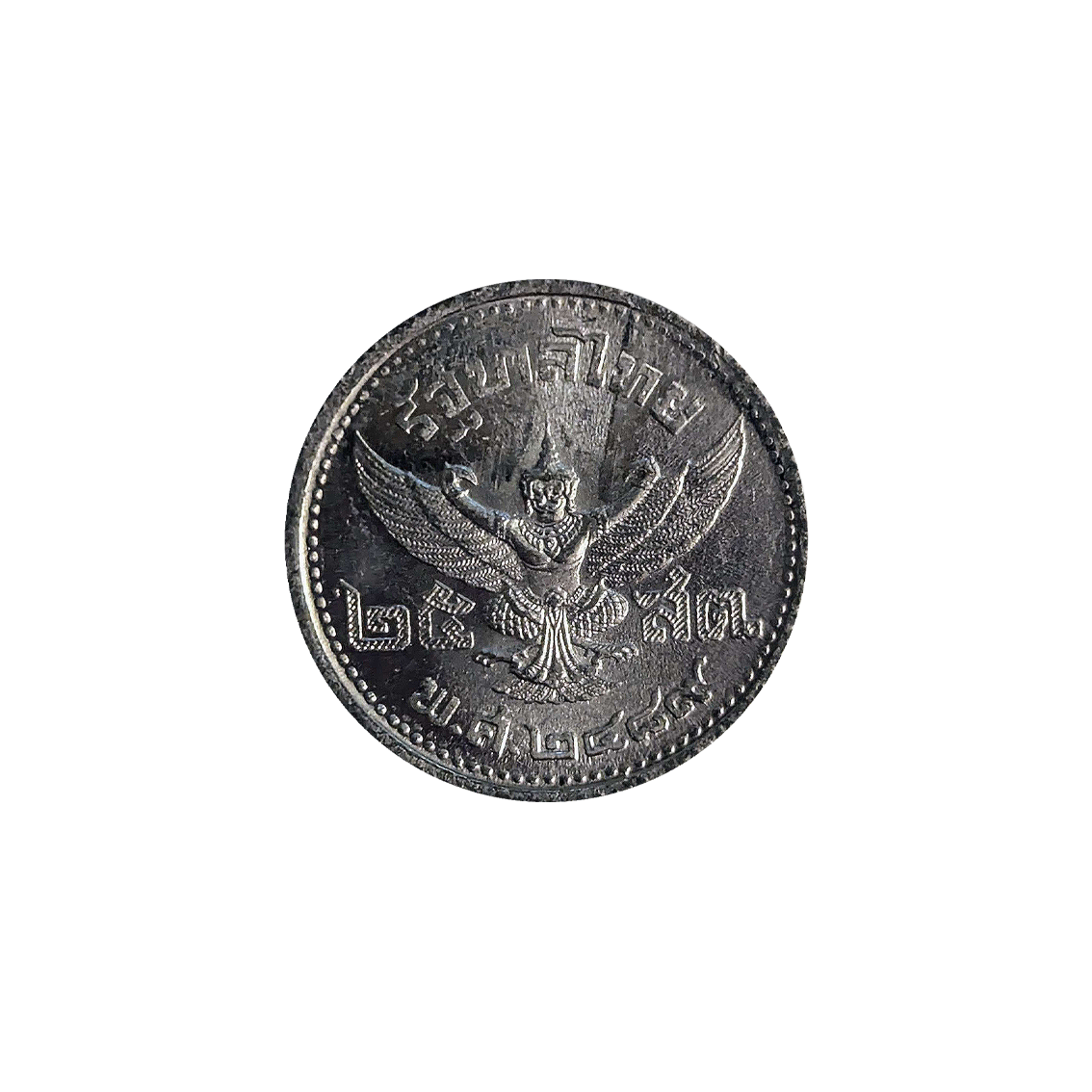
1946

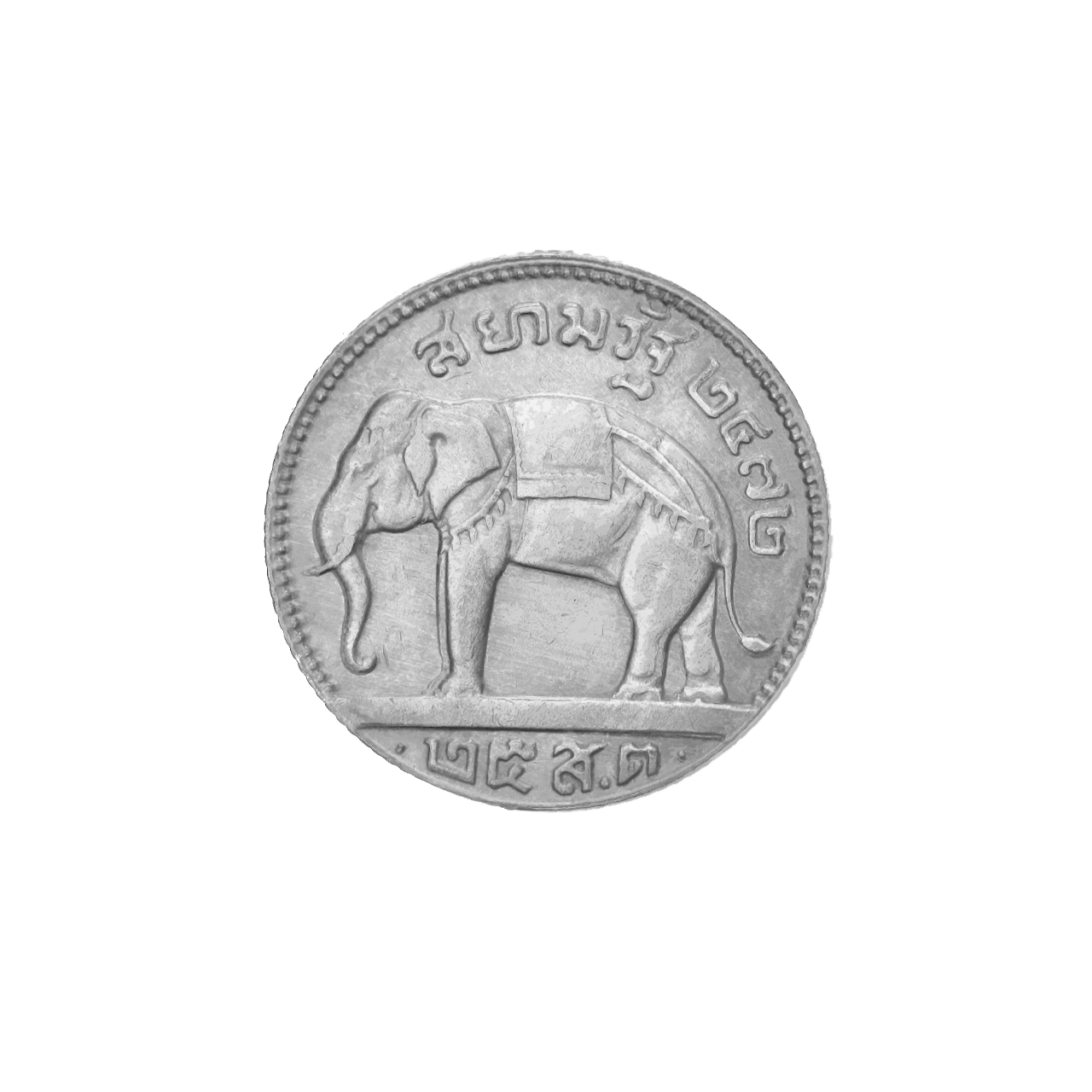
1929

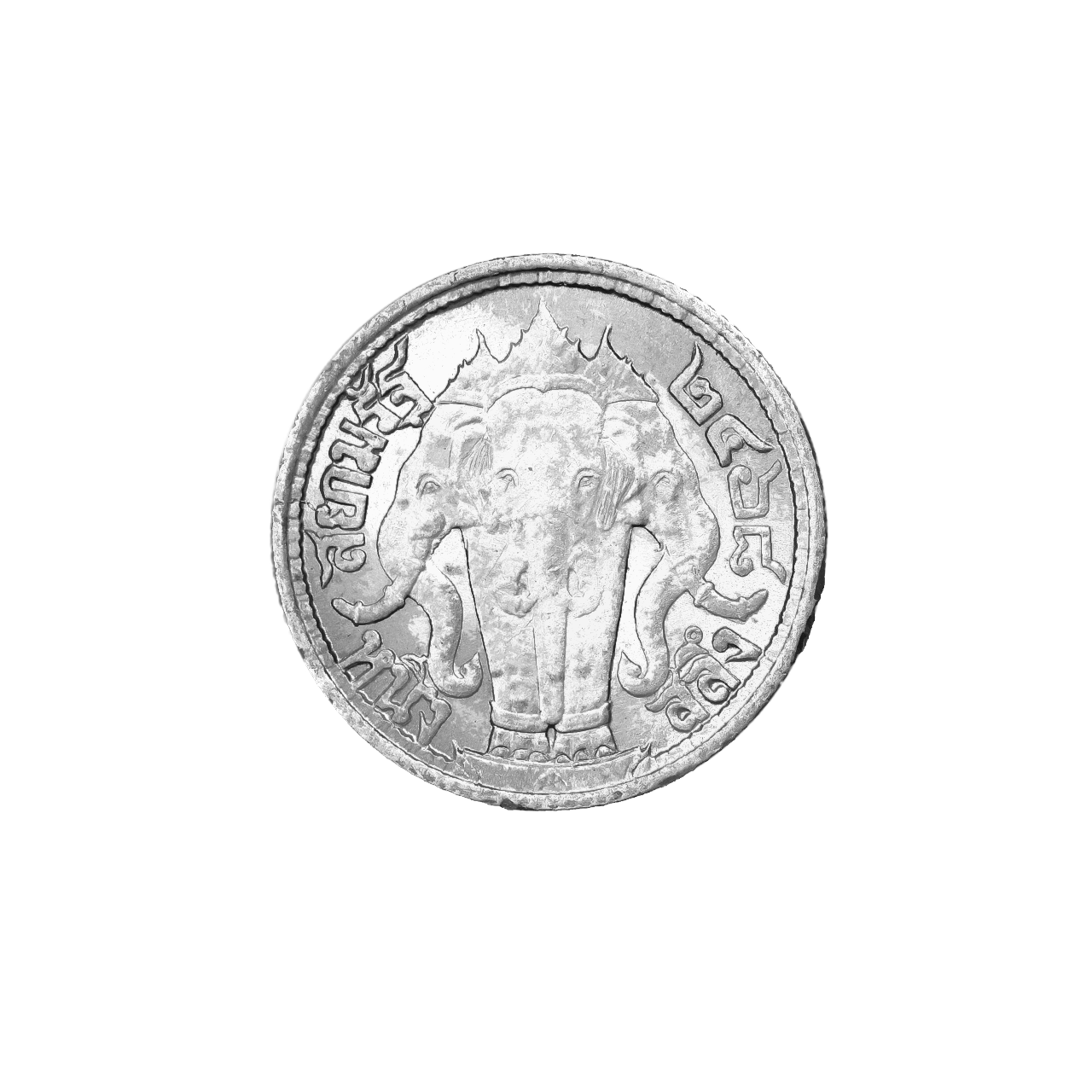
1913

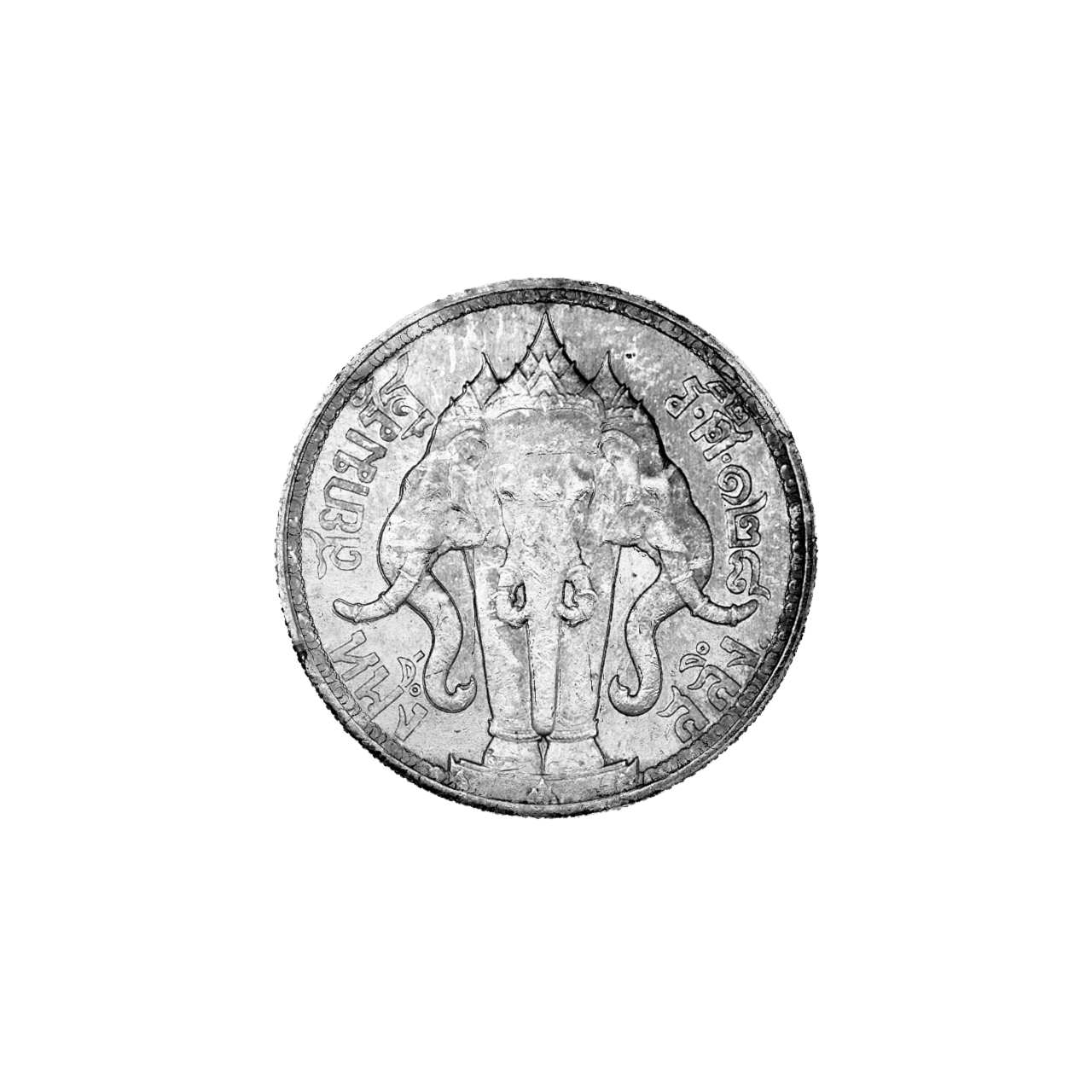
1909

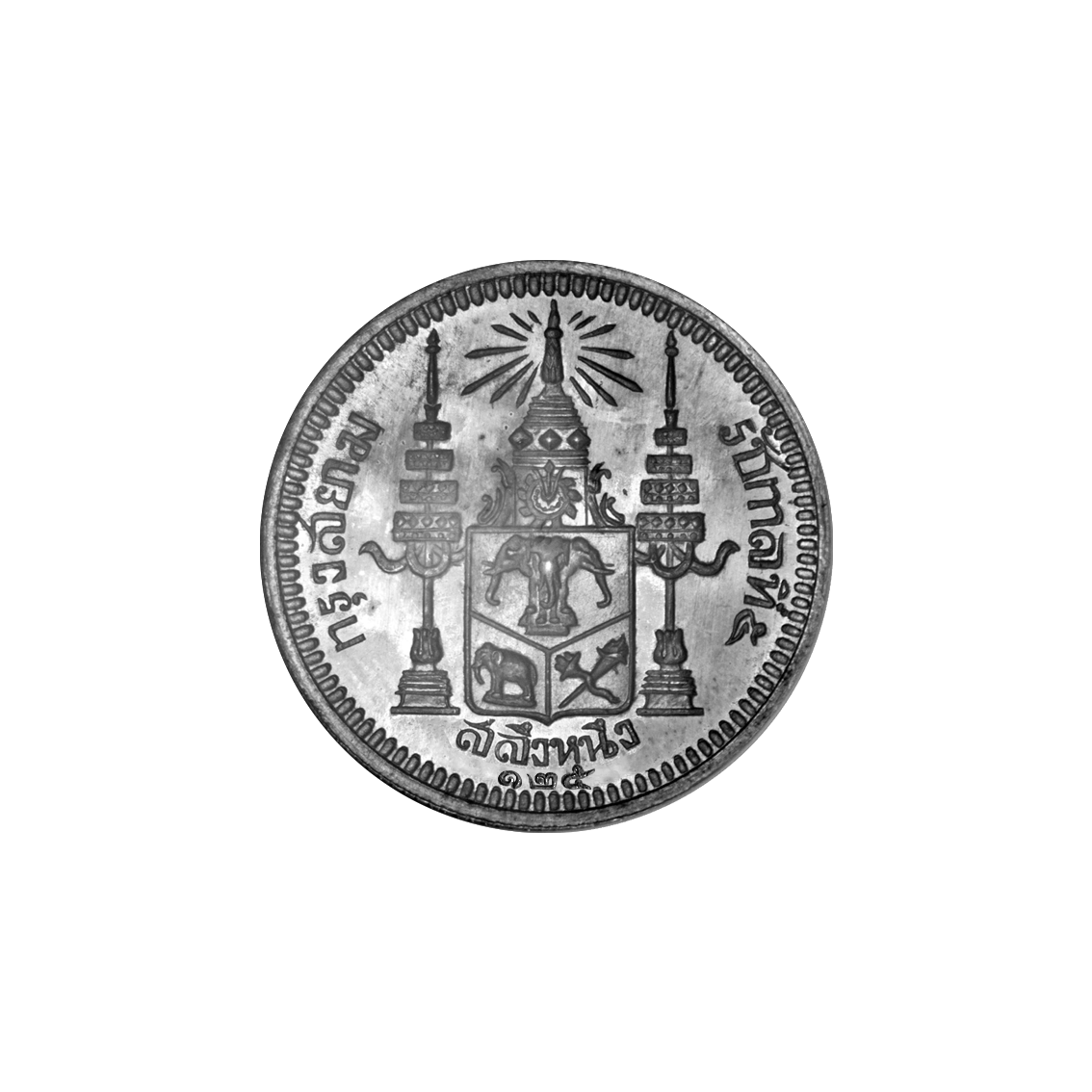
1901

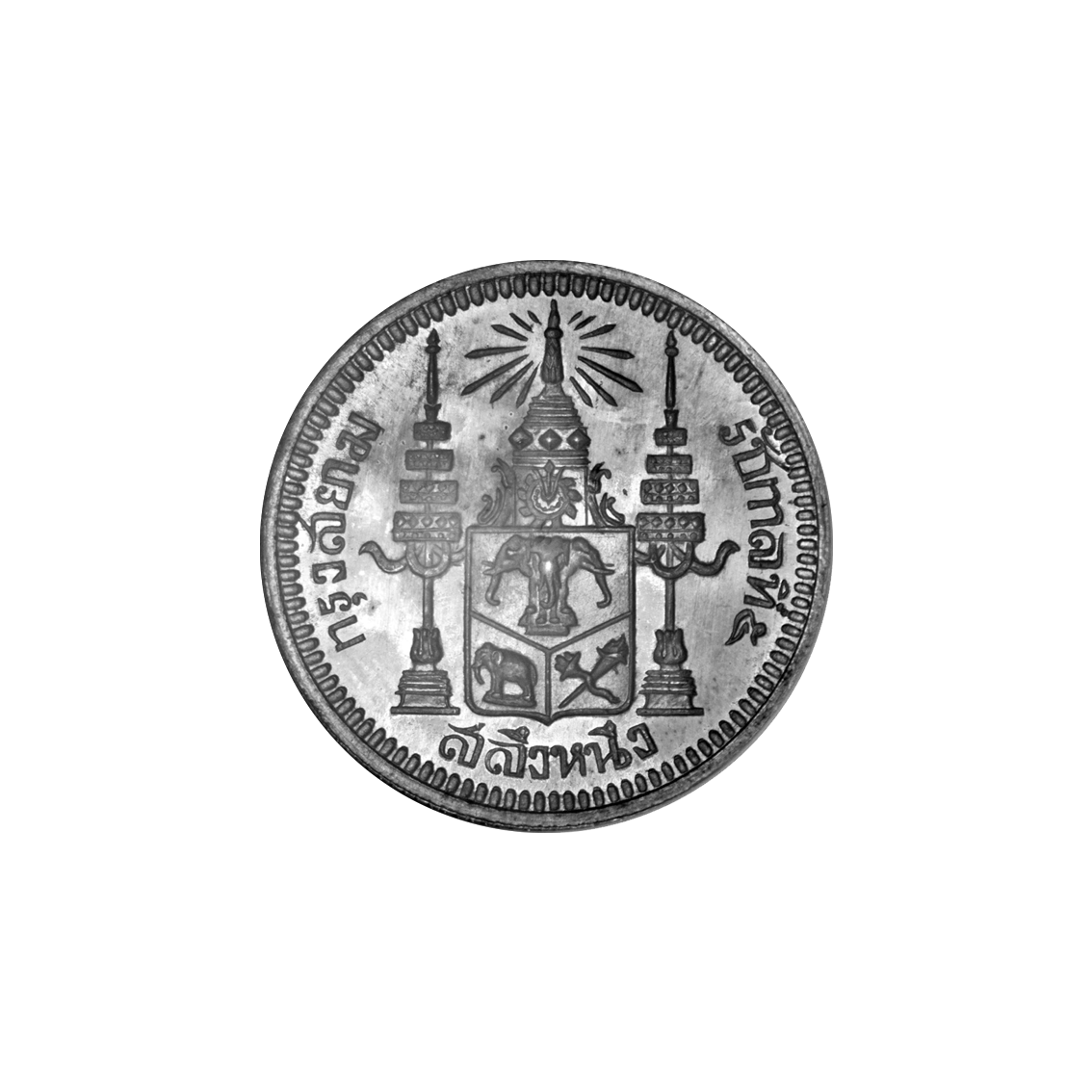
1876

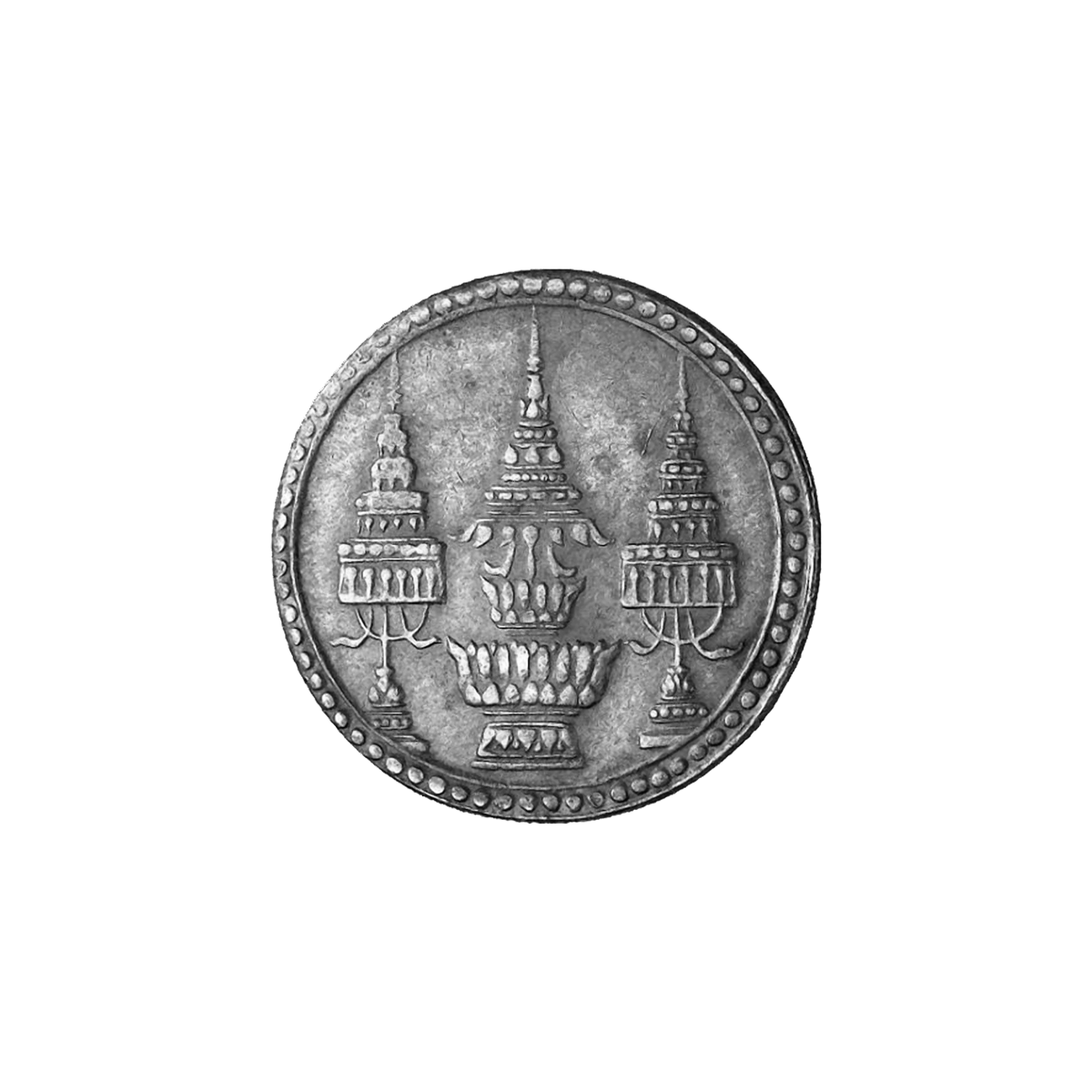
1869

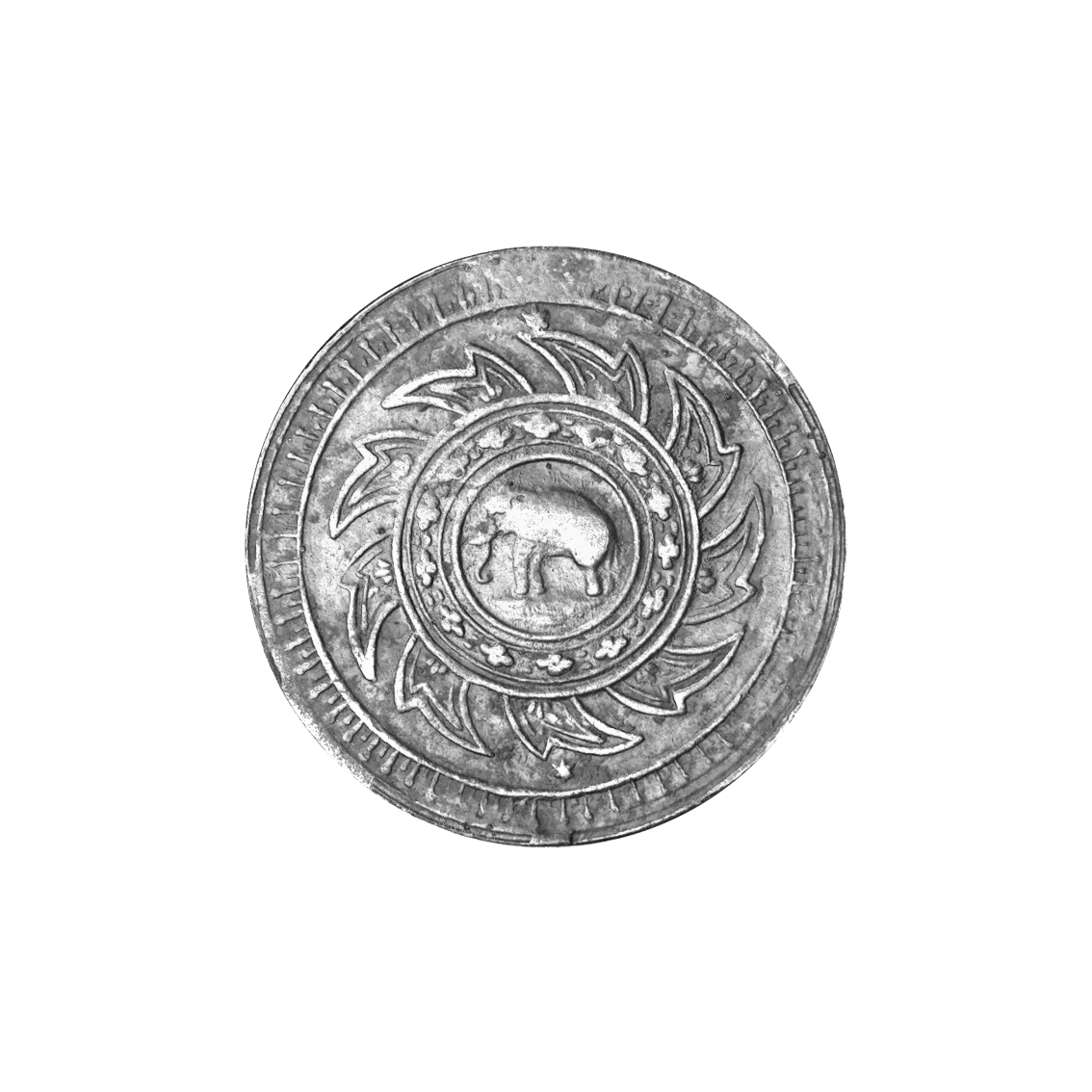
1862

== Mintages ==
- 1987 ~ 5,108,000
- 1988 ~ 42,096,000
- 1989 ~ 58,940,000
- 1990 ~ 81,384,000
- 1991 ~ 45,496,380
- 1992 ~ 71,311,000
- 1993 ~ 236,130,000
- 1994 ~ 102,856,000
- 1995 ~ 17,000,000
- 1996 ~ 185,012,523
- 1997 ~ 85,000,000
- 1998 ~ 20,000,000
- 1999 ~ 10,000
- 2000 ~ 200,098,000
- 2001 ~ 10,000
- 2002 ~ 141,562,000
- 2003 ~ 82,668,000
- 2004 ~ 104,830,000
- 2005 ~ 95,362,000
- 2006 ~ 120,003,000
- 2007 ~ 180,000,000
- 2008 (old series) ~ 255,600
- 2008 (new series) ~ 289,995,600
- 2009 ~ 220,000,000
