= Royal Thai Mint =

Mint of Thailand

Coordinates: 14°0′35.22″N 100°37′3.33″E

- Company type: Sub-division of the Treasury Department
- Industry: Coin and medal production
- Founded: 1860
- Headquarters: Khlong Luang, Pathum Thani, Thailand
- Area served: Thailand
- Key people: Somluck Tungnaikunnatham (Director)
- Products: Thai coins, medals and Royal Thai orders and decorations
- Owner: Ministry of Finance
- Number of employees: 900+
- Website: www.royalthaimint.net

The Bureau of Royal Thai Mint (Thai: สำนักกษาปณ์ or โรงกษาปณ์; RTGS: Samnak Kasap or Rong Kasap) is situated in Pathum Thani, Thailand. It is a sub-division of the Treasury Department, Ministry of Finance.

== History ==
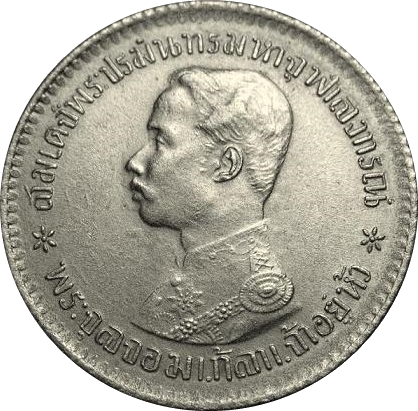
1908 King Chulalongkorn coin

The first mint was established in 1860, inside the Grand Palace, as Rong Krasap Sitthikan (Thai: โรงกระสาปน์สิทธิการ). Because of limited space, the mint was moved to the new building in 1875 (where Wat Phra Kaew Museum is located today). Then it was moved to Chaofa Road in 1902 (where the National Gallery is located today), to Pradiphat Road in 1972 and to the present mint in 2002. The mint at Pathum Thani was officially opened by Princess Maha Chakri Sirindhorn on 2 July 2003.

The Royal Thai Mint is responsible for the production of Thai coins, medals and Royal Thai orders and decorations. The coin distributor is responsible of the Bureau of Monetary Management.
