= Great Qing Treasure Note =

Qing dynasty paper money, issued 1853–1859

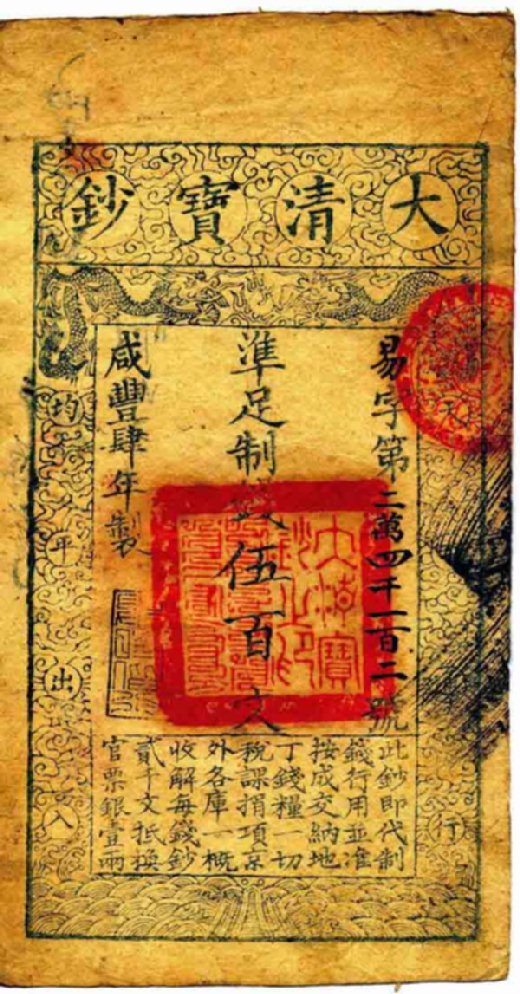
A Great Qing Treasure Note (大清寶鈔) of 500 wén in Zhiqian.

The Great Qing Treasure Note (simplified Chinese: 大清宝钞; traditional Chinese: 大清寶鈔; pinyin: Dà Qīng Bǎo Chāo) or Da-Qing Baochao refers to a series of Qing dynasty government notes issued under the reign of the Xianfeng Emperor issued between the years 1853 (Xianfeng 3) and 1859 (Xianfeng 9). These government notes were all denominated in wén and were usually introduced to the general market through the salaries of soldiers and government officials.

After the Taiping Rebellion had depleted the imperial treasury of the Qing dynasty the government reformed the cash coin system to include higher denominations with low intrinsic values essentially creating a fiat currency; this was a radical departure from China's past where the value of cash coins was dependent on their weight rather than any denominations. The same developments which lead to the creation of the new Xianfeng coinage had also necessitated the reintroduction of paper money in China after it was absent for two centuries. The new paper currency came in two forms, one was the copper-alloy cash coins-based Great Qing Treasure Note and the other was the silver sycee-based Hubu Guanpiao (戶部官票) which were both introduced simultaneously with the new debased cash coinage.

However, the government did not keep adequate reserves of hard currency to back the new notes up. Many provincial governments didn't allow for taxes to be paid using paper money, and after a few years the government started refusing to convert the new paper money into hard currency; consequently, the Chinese people started to distrust it as a valid medium of exchange. In response to the ever more expensive military expenditures caused by the Taiping Rebellion, the government produced more and more high denomination notes, which were not convertible. This caused hyperinflation; by the year Xianfeng 9 (1859) the currency had become completely depreciated and was abolished.

== History ==
=== Earlier Qing dynasty notes ===
During the transition from Ming to Qing the Manchu government-issued notes known as Hubu Guanpiao (戶部官票) or Shunzhi Guanpiao (順治官票) or Shunzhi Chaoguan (順治鈔貫) which were first issued in the year 1651 on initiative of the Minister of Revenue, Wei Xiangshu (魏象樞) during the war with the remnants of the Ming dynasty to cover the more immediate expenses of the Manchus as the finances of the Qing during this period were in dire distress, these notes were declared void only a decade after their issued. An annual amount of 128,000 guàn (貫) of these early Manchu notes were issued, with a total sum of 1.28 million guàn being produced before they were abolished. The denominations of the Hubu Guanpiao followed the pattern of the Ming dynasty period paper notes, but as historiographical sources about the early Qing era paper money are scarce, not much can be known about them.

Peng Xinwei suggested that the Manchu rulers of the Qing were very much atavistic towards the inflationary pressure that the earlier Jurchen Empire experienced after they had abused their ability to print Jiaochao notes. Modern scholars argue that the notes issued during the Shunzhi period, while only brief, likely entrenched the reluctance of the Qing dynasty to issue notes because this issue also proved inflationary confirming their fears.

It has been suggested by Taiwanese economic historian Lin Man-houng that Chinese money shops did not start with the production of their own private notes until the end of the Qianlong period, these shops were very likely to have been more developed in Northern China, where these money shops produced notes which were mostly denominated in cash coins while notes from Southern China tended to be denominated in taels of silver. It is also possible that private-order notes could have emerged earlier in the 18th century and that their presence would become very common by the 1820s.

=== Economic and monetary background ===
The precursor of paper money (紙幣) known as "flying cash" were issued by the Tang dynasty; however, these bills of exchange could in no way be considered to be a form of paper money as they weren't meant to be a medium of exchange and were only negotiable between two distant points. The first true paper money in the world was issued under the Song dynasty, these were promissory notes issued by merchants in Sichuan known as the Jiaozi, under the reign of Emperor Zhenzong (997–1022) the government of the Song dynasty granted a monopoly for the production of Jiaozi notes to sixteen wealthy merchants in Sichuan, as these merchants were slow to redeem their notes and inflation started affecting these private notes the government nationalised paper money in the year 1023 under the Bureau of Exchange. As these paper notes were backed by the government they were instantly successful and the people regarded them to be equally trustworthy as cash coins, other types of paper notes issued under the Song dynasty include the Huizi and the Guanzi. Before the Mongol Empire conquered China the Jin dynasty also issued paper money.

Before the establishment of the Ming dynasty the Mongol Yuan dynasty had suffered from a severe case of hyperinflation which made the paper money issued by them worthless. Under the reign of the Yuan dynasty copper cash coins remained in circulation with the inscriptions Zhida Tongbao (至大通寶), Dayuan Tongbao (大元通寶), and Zhizheng Tongbao (至正通寶) forming the majority of the circulating issues and "strings of cash coins" remaining a currency unit. Silver then started to occupy a paramount place in the Mongol economy and was supplemented by government issued paper money. Under the reign of Kublai Khan the Zhongtong Jiaochao (中統交鈔) was issued whose value was based on the fabric silk. Under the reign of Külüg Khan in the year 1308 the Zhiyuan Baochao (至元寶鈔) was issued which was supplemented with the silver-based Zhida Yinchao (至大銀鈔), but these circulated only for a year. The final series of paper money issued by the government of the Yuan dynasty from 1350 were the Zhizheng Jiaochao (至正交鈔). A major difference between how paper money was used under the Mongols and under the Song dynasty was that, in certain regions of the Yuan dynasty, paper notes were the only acceptable form of currency and could not be exchanged in either copper cash coins or silver sycees. Exchanging paper money into copper or silver was known as duìxiàn (兌現, "convert into specie") which was the main reason why earlier forms of paper money were deemed reliable. As these regions were completely dependent on paper money inflation hit them more severely as their notes could not be converted into a currency based on any intrinsic value, for this reason the Mongols allowed their subjects to continue using copper-alloy cash coins and issued new ones every now and then. During the last few decades of the Yuan dynasty the inflation caused people to lose their trust in paper money and barter became the most common means of exchange.

During the beginning of Manchu rule over China in the year 1644, the total imperial revenues of the Qing dynasty were an approximated 30,000,000 taels. Imperial Government expenditures at the time were correspondingly modest. During the balanced periods in Qing dynasty history of the 17th and 18th centuries imperial revenue consistently exceeded government expenditures, which resulted in a tidy cash surplus in the Imperial Chinese Treasury. The vastness of China created poor communications across government offices and a general looseness of administration encouraged all sorts of irregularities across the country. During the course of the Taiping Rebellion China would see a third of its people die utterly devastating its economy in the process. Of China's 18 wealthiest provinces 12 were left in ruins, this would put a heavy strain on the resources of the government of the Qing dynasty putting it near breaking point as the rebellion had sown the seeds for further calamities which would hurt the economy of China even more and ultimately led to the downfall of the Qing dynasty during the next century. The main source of income for the government of the Qing dynasty was taxation.

The Taiping Rebellion was the largest civil war that China had experienced up until that point. The Qing dynasty Army of the Green Standard and its bannermen had long since fallen into decay, revealing the decrepit state of the Chinese military. Near the end of the year 1851, the Ministry of Revenue in Beijing promulgated the Statutes for Raising Military Funds (餉事例). After repeated defeats on the field of battle suffered by the Chinese government, new armies and new types of armies had to be raised. For this task the Emperor was forced to turn to the provinces. Eventually, the imperial Chinese government had no recourse other than to place full responsibility in these newly formed units led by local warlords and aristocrats. Zeng Guofan, the architect of eventual victory over the Taiping Heavenly Kingdom, was given unprecedented powers in this pursuit. By January of the year 1862 conditions had worsened. Zeng's troops now only received 40% of their pay, and even so, payment fell as much as 15 months behind. Desertions now began occurring for the first time in 9 years of fighting. The government withdrew from conventional modes of centralised war financing as it has been proven ineffective. In turn, it allowed the Chinese provinces a greater flexibility in raising revenues than before, mainly by greatly expanding office selling, a time-honored Chinese fiscal emergency measure of the Ministry of Revenue in the capital city but this was never used on such a scale by provincial and military administrations. The offices being sols were those of jiansheng (監生) and gongsheng (貢生).

Silver ingots known as sycees have been a part of the Chinese monetary system since around the Tang and Song dynasties, but due to the natural scarcity of silver in China were rare and the use of silver currency was limited to the upper classes of Chinese society and their use was to be given as tribute, to pay bribes, to give away as gifts, silver sycees were also used as a method of transporting large funds over long distances as well as for hoarding wealth, and was used by the government to pay military expenses. This all changed when the Ming dynasty started trading with the Portuguese during the 16th century, large amounts of European silver would enter the trading port of Guangzhou leading to a large surplus of the metal in China as merchants began using silver to pay their taxes with. The amounts of silver flowing in increased dramatically after the Qing dynasty was forced to open more ports following the Opium Wars. Since the circulating silver sycee in China was rarely of the same degree of fineness, a standard unit of account had to be devised, this unit of exchange for accounting silver came to be known in English as the "tael" (which is pronounced the same as the English word "tail").

The tael itself was not a form of currency, but rather a weight used to represent one pure ounce of commercial silver. As China was a rather large country where local customs tended to vary widely, an ounce would oftentimes in one place not necessarily be an ounce in another part of China. Consequently, a large variety of different scales were employed all over China by different trades, each of these scales varying somewhat from the other scales that were used in different fields of commerce.

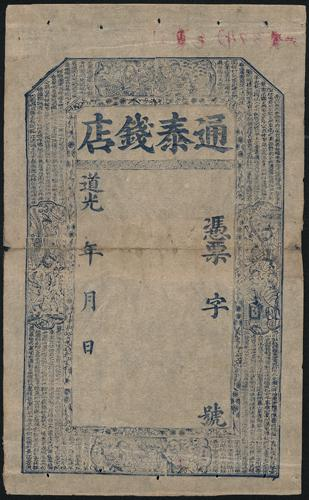
A privately produced note from the Daoguang era Tong Tai Money Shop. During this era the Manchu government did not produce its own notes.

The Xianfeng Emperor can't be completely blamed for the monetary crisis the Qing dynasty experienced during this era. The monetary policy of the Qing government had been effective for over 160 years, yet under the Daoguang Emperor's reign, which preceded that of Xianfeng, inherent problems to the system were becoming evident. 3 principal issues with the system arose. First, cash coinage became debased due to dishonest officials and the failure of the copper supply dependent on the copper mines of Yunnan which had been interdicted by the rebels. Secondly, the Chinese silver sector, with its system of Loofang (which was the private smelting of sycees), was never able to adequately fulfil the demands of Chinese commercial sector; and thirdly, the Qing dynasty was ruled by a government which proved incapable of enforcing the monetary policy which had worked so well for previous dynasties. All these factors reached a climax around the year Xianfeng 3 (1853). By this time the rebel armies of the Taiping Heavenly Kingdom had conquered the city of Nanjing and established their capital there. Which called for measures beyond traditional solutions.

By the time of this occurrence the imperial Chinese treasury was as good as empty. Zeng Guofan realized that his army could not survive off the land in rebel infested Anhui, Jiangsu, and Zhejiang provinces. Since the around the end of the year 1858 Jiangxi province had been molested very little by the Taiping rebels, Zeng became dependent upon the province of Jiangxi for his military supplies and made its defense an essential part of his counter-rebellion strategy. The main sources of income of the province at the time were agriculturally based; however, the collection of statistical data collected by the bureaucratic apparatus upon which the taxation system was based was often completely disrupted during Taiping incursions into the area, thus depriving the Ministry of Revenue of its base upon which to collect these taxes. This resulted that land taxes and grain tributes which were the 2 principal sources of revenue, were in large measure not paid to the central government in Beijing. additionally, taxes that were collected were often diverted to the local provincial treasuries to defray provincial military expenses. To make up in part for these losses, the lijin tax was introduced. During the entire Taiping Rebellion there were never sufficient funds to run the Chinese government and pay the army to crush the rebellion.

These taxes collected by the imperial Chinese government took many different forms; the most important of which were the land tax system, the grain tribute, the imperial customs revenue system, the tax on the salt monopoly, lijin, and miscellaneous taxes and duties imposed on the people. From ancient times the land tax had produced up to two-thirds of the Chinese government's total revenue. In China, historically all land within its territory was considered to be the property of the Emperor, the monarch having acquired it through conquest. How this land was used, however, was left to those that occupied and lived on it in return for a yearly tax based upon the rental value of the land in question. In the year 1713 the Kangxi Emperor had fixed the rent collected by the imperial Chinese government at 3/4 tael per 6 mou (or 1 acre) of land and issued a decree that this ratio should stand for all time unchanged. From time to time however the actual land tax collected by the Chinese government was reduced in some areas where necessary as a result of natural disasters such as floods and earthquakes and human disasters such as rebellions and insurrections.

The Chinese provinces most devastated by the Taiping Rebellion which were Anhui, Zhejiang, Henan, Jiangxi, Jiangsu, Guizhou, and Sichuan enjoyed a governmental sanctioned "tax break" for decades due to the destruction that was wreaked upon them by the Taiping Rebellion. This "tax break" accounted for much loss of imperial government revenue which it had previously gained from those provinces. The proceeds of the land tax money collected during this era at the provincial level were substantially decreased. Severe irregularities and mass extortion commonly took place on the part of local tax collectors.

The second most important tax collected by the imperial Chinese government was the grain tribute. Yearly quotas were set, but these quotas were limited to only the 15 provinces with fertile soil which were all situated along the basin of the Yangtze River. The quotas set up by the Imperial Chinese government were assessed based upon local grain productivity in these provinces.

The Chinese government levered duties on customs and goods which entered China since ancient times dating to the same era as the land era. With the forced opening of the Qing dynasty's doors after the Opium Wars and the following increase in maritime trade with foreign nations, the customs duties took on a vastly expanded level of importance in the Chinese taxation system. Before the year 1854 the same rather lax administration and sleight of hand was practiced with the collection of the import customs as the Chinese government exercised with the land tax. In September 1853 an event happened which would change the way these customs were collected forever, and in the process, this event resulted transforming the Chinese maritime customs into a competent and highly efficient force for acquiring tax revenue for the Chinese government. In September of the year 1853 the Taiping rebels, fighting their way down the Yangtze valley while leaving a lot of destruction in their wake, threatened the port city of Shanghai. The loyal Chinese government officials lost no time in fleeing to Shanghai's International Settlement which was protected by guns of foreign warships stationed there. The Customs House of Shanghai by this time had been abandoned. Foreign traders and businessmen, refusing to pay duties to unauthorized Chinese officials, came to declare their imported goods instead to their representative consulates in the city until the Chinese Customs House could be reopened. This resulted to a considerable amount of workload for these foreign consulates, as the funds raised through customs duties were based upon a 5% ad valorem tax on all imports and exports in Shanghai. The foreign consular officials, who were unable to cope with this high volume, set up the Maritime Customs Service to be run by British, American, and French consular representatives and gave this office the task of collecting all customs duties on traded goods. As at the time only the British inspector was able to speak Mandarin Chinese, he was handed the office of the Inspector General. It was very rare for contemporary Chinese merchants who came into the Shanghai International Settlement to have had any prior contact with Western people. These people now could now observe western business practices and their administration at very close quarters. Some of these refugees who fled into the International Settlement were quick to realise that their country would benefit if China was to follow the West's example. These impressions of foreign business acumen gained during this era, together with cooperation arising out of need in this chaotic time in Chinese history, would lead to the creation of the first native Chinese modern shipping companies and similar business enterprises. The Imperial Maritime Customs was organised so well that it would become a model of efficiency, so efficient in fact that the British would never relinquish their control of this system during imperial China, the Manchus would continue this arrangement to the end of the Qing dynasty.

Since ancient times in China, the salt trade was treated as a government monopoly. John E. Sandrock described the administration of this commodity to be "so complicated, that by comparison, it would make a Rubik's cube look like mere child's play." As the commodity of salt was not uniformly distributed throughout Chinese territory, China was divided into many districts in an attempt to equalise natural conditions in various places. A timetable of tax collection was composed such as the Chinese salt traffic would bear. Consumers near the sea were taxed much higher, for example, this fact would be motivational to everyone to inspire them to evaporate their own salt, while in places where no salt was produced too high a tax would drive consumption down thereby reducing the revenues made. By this act of fine tuning the Chinese salt tax the Imperial Treasury of China kept up a steady flow of income of significant proportions.

The 5th of the imperial revenue sources was also by far the most diversified. These were the "miscellaneous taxes and duties", this category included everything imaginable to be taxed. There were separate taxes on deeds, wine, tobacco, tea, sugar, and timber to list a few. Operating a business was taxed. There was a mining tax mining, a butcher tax, a pawnshop tax, and a fishing tax. In reality, only very little has actually changed over the years. Duties were levied on goods such as grain, silk, cattle, wagons, oil, cotton, camels, bamboo, sulfur, cloth among others. Despite the large range of the above taxes and duties, each tax in and of itself was very minor and of small consequence to the individual in China, however in the aggregate, it was of great significance to the Chinese government. Collecting and accounting for this diverse revenue constituted a real nightmare of administration for imperial Chinese government tax agencies.

As a way to enhance the revenue the Chinese government introduced the Lijin tax (釐金, "a contribution of a thousandth" in Mandarin Chinese, or 1‰) which would prove to be very successful; however, this tax severely hampered trade and commence. The lijin was a tax imposed upon traded commodities. Lijin collection points were established along all highways and waterways in China. Additionally, the lijin tax was collected at every border crossing between Chinese provinces and at all city gates. Lumber originating on the upper Yalu River and bound for the capital city of Beijing has to pass through no less than 68 inspection stations to be taxed. The lijin collected added no less than 17% to the cost of this material. The lijin tax limited the amount collected in any one province to 10%. The tolls collected on passing commodities substantially slowed the flow of business within China. The lijin system would survive the fall of the Qing dynasty as it was a major source of revenue. The lijin tax would constitute the principal source of income for the Chinese provinces and was most essential to the military operations conducted by Zeng Guofan. The Ministry of Revenue assigned which funds had to be sent to the central government in Beijing and which could be retained for local provincial use. The fact that, at times, the military payment of provincial troops was 8 to 9 months in some areas established that the money more often went to Beijing than to the coffers of the provincial governments.

One scheme the imperial Chinese government introduced to raise funds was to allow provincial governments to sell Imperial Academy degrees, the profits from this were collected into a fund known as the jiansheng silver fund (監銀). Under the reign of the Daoguang Emperor, provincial treasuries kept approximately 48% of the money made from this scheme in provincial grain reserves known as Changpingcang (常平倉) and provincial silver reserves known as fengzhuyin (封貯銀), the Ministry of Revenue was attempting to get their hands on a third of these reserves, factually borrowing against the predicted income of the provincial Jiansheng silver funds which was feeding these reserves. This scheme was only functional if the imperial Chinese government had status awards (which were symbolic capital) which people would actually want to purchase using real economic capital, the imperial government would have to be able to arbitrarily dictate the prices for these symbolic awards, and would also have maintained complete control over the selling process for these awards. Chinese censor Huashana (花沙納) was highly critical of the Ministry of Revenue's profit-generating plan to start selling provincial examination degrees and titles (舉人), this had in the history of China never been allowed to be sold before showcasing how desperate the Ministry of Revenue was at the time for generating money to continue fighting the expensive war. Huashana praised the idea of producing paper money as a far better alternative to selling offices and degrees, but despite his anti-office selling stance he did not advocate for it to be abolished.

During the 19th century, Chinese trade in commodities such as tea, silk, and grain was of such a large volume that this trade actually taxed the capabilities of the copper-alloy cash coins-based currency system of China. During this period imperial Chinese revenues had to be remitted to the capital city of Beijing and provisional salaries paid. At the time the transportation of large sums of precious metal bullion was both expensive and risky to undertake. However, with the outbreak of the Taiping rebellion the business of transacting funds and revenue became even more dangerous. In order to overcome these new difficulties the existing Shanxi banks (票号, "draft banks" or "remittance banks", which had earned this nickname as most remittance banks were owned and operated by merchants from the province of Shanxi, meanwhile foreigners in China called these institutions "native banks" to describe both the Shanxi banks and large money lenders whose businesses had accumulated a sufficient of capital to make loans) were greatly expanded to accommodate this demand. The principal function of the Shanxi banks under normal circumstances was that to send currency to more distant places in payment for traded goods and services. For this service the remittance banks charged a fee which ranged from 2% to 6%. During the usual course of business, these banks also held Qing Chinese government funds for disbursement. As the Shanxi banks were strongly represented in the north of China, the Chinese government saw it as only natural that these banks would be chosen to disburse the Hubu Guanpiao tael notes through their services. The Shanxi banks were often active in the assigned treaty ports cultivating the business of both Chinese merchants and foreigner traders alike. The Shanxi banks tended to be very competitive in their nature and cooperated extensively with other branches of banking corporations within their own sphere, they would often send crucial banking-related news to member banks by carrier pigeon. Prior to the introduction of the railroad to China, the Chinese economy relied heavily on Shanxi banks to finance inter-city commerce. In Northern China the preferred method of land transportation was the camel due to the fact that these animals could cope with the conditions of Northern China while many other animals couldn't, and the Shanxi banks employed camels in the north for transportation. The Shanxi banks and other Chinese banking companies were essential in connecting the various monetary systems that circulated in China at the time by facilitating interregional trade and commerce, providing credit for merchants, and cooperating in times of crisis. It was customary for example for the Shanghai banks to make advances to junk owners who were engaged in the trade of carrying tribute rice to the north, holding their vessels as collateral. These junks after having unloaded their rice in the port, would return with shipments of oil, peas, bean cakes, and other products for trade.

In the year 1858, a crisis occurred when the Shanghai banks would let the merchants borrow money to pay for the import of various foreign products and merchandise with the expectation that the tribute junks would return with oil and foodstuffs with a value that would be sufficient to offset the advance paid by the Shanghai banks. However, at this time the Second Opium War was being fought with the United Kingdom and France in the northern parts of China. The tribute junks were sunk on their voyage back to Shanghai. Had bullion in precious metals such as gold and silver have been demanded immediately to cover the loss that had occurred during this crisis, then the Shanghai banks would have gone bankrupt. Being allied with the Shanxi group, the local Shanghai banks were given time by the holders of the notes to obtain the necessary funds from other Chinese cities and the crisis which could have severely affected the economy of Shanghai negatively was thereby averted.

The Taiping Rebellion had caused the government of the Qing dynasty to fall into an extreme debt spiral which forced it to reconsider introducing paper money as a medium for exchange. This was advertised by the imperial government as a necessary evil because of a shortage of bronze which meant that the production of cash coinage had to be heavily scaled down. The pauperised Chinese public was for centuries uncompromisingly minded against the idea of paper money emissions in any way, shape, or form and would not accept it for any reason. Half a century earlier in the year 1814, when Cai Zhiding (蔡之定, Ts'ai Chih-Ting), who was a high official in the Ministry of State, petitioned to the court of the Jiaqing Emperor advocating the resumption of a paper money currency, this request was denied. Cai was later severely rebuked in the Jiaqing Emperor's memorial in which he pointed out that neither the Chinese government nor any individuals in the past had experienced benefits from the circulation of a paper money. The Jiaqing Emperor was not fully without justification in asserting his stance against paper currency, as the Ming era government notes from their introduction had been inconvertible into metal currencies. With no government backing into any other forms of currency these notes were swiftly depreciated. While this may seem only logical today the Chinese had to learn this lesson the hard way.

The first radical change to the Chinese monetary system involved the authorization and introduction of "big cash coins" (大錢 - known today as multiple cash coins). This measurement was seen as one of the only remaining options left, and simultaneously the Qing government decided to reintroduce paper currency. Xianfeng's paper money consisted of two types of paper bank notes, the first of which was denominated in qian, or copper cash; and the second type, in silver taels.

=== Introduction of the Great Qing Treasure Note ===
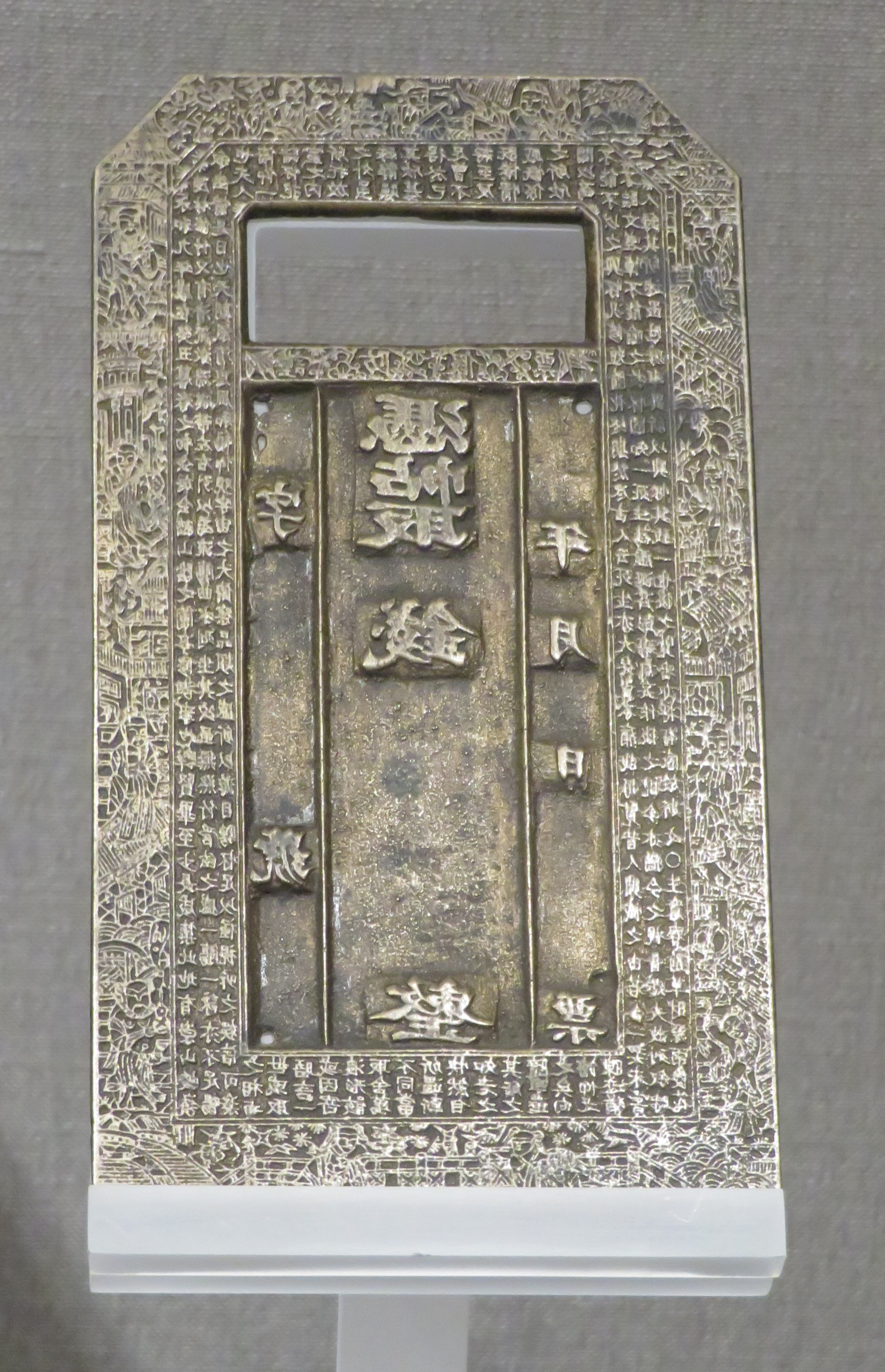
A printing plate for the Great Qing Treasure Note in the collection of the Inner Mongolia Museum.

As the general population of the Qing dynasty at the time was living in extreme poverty, the commodity of copper was the basis of the Chinese monetary system as the majority of the Chinese people had very little economic power and could barely survive off of their income, by contrast silver was the preferred currency of the upper class society including merchants, traders, and aristocrats. Millions of Chinese peasants for millennia knew of no other medium of exchange than copper-alloy cash coins. All daily purchases of the common people were counted in cash coins. The reintroduction of paper money was specifically denominated in copper-alloy cash coins to allow it to be trusted by the general Chinese populace, comparatively the paper money used by the Ming dynasty could not be converted into coinages of any kind which proved to be an extremely calamitous decision as it had effectively discouraged the reintroduction of paper money in China up until this point. However, the Taiping Rebellion brought both extensive devastation and high defense costs to the point that within 3 years the Xianfeng administration felt forced to re-adopt paper currency. At the same time, mints across China started releasing a substantial amount of new Daqian coins, whose nominal value vastly exceeded their intrinsic copper value. Both currencies would prove to become exceedingly inflationary as time passed by, this disrupted the market exchange rate of copper to silver and lead to unrest among the people.

While military expenses were the main reason the government of the Qing dynasty return to issuing notes again after four hundred years without using them. There were also other arguments in favour of a paper currency; the earlier advantages of adopting paper currencies had not been entirely forgotten by the Chinese people. The people supporting the reintroduction of fiat money claimed that it could be produced at minimal cost and could circulate widely within the Chinese empire. Being lightweight, paper money could be carried around my traders and officials with ease and concealed on one's person as opposed to strings of cash coins which were always visible and a low-effort target for potential robbers. Another argument in favour was that notes were not dividable into various grades of purity like is customary for precious metals like silver. Nor does paper money have to be weighed whenever it is used in a monetary transaction. Neither can notes be clipped by dishonest money lenders as was so often the case with silver coins and sycees. The strongest arguments in favour of the use of paper held over hard forms of currency from the government's perspective were twofold. The first reason was that if paper took the place of copper and copper-alloys would stop used in casting cash coins, the copper saved could be used in the production of weapons for the imperial Chinese and provincial armies. The second reason was that in the case replacing of silver coinages, if the mercantile (merchants) and commercial (business owners) classes could be brought to the persuasion to accept paper notes in lieu of silver, then the silver saved could be stored up in the government coffers.

Eventually, the arguments for reintroduction of paper money prevailed and the Great Qing Treasure Note and Great Qing Hubu Guanpiao were introduced in the year Xianfeng 3 (1853). The notes denominated in copper-alloy cash coins and the notes denominated in taels of silver were introduced simultaneously to the Chinese market by the government. Unlike the earlier Great Ming Treasure Notes these paper notes were to be backed by the government and were supposed to be fully convertible on demand. Notes denominated in copper-alloy cash coins were referred to as Chaopiao (鈔票, or "precious notes") and Qianpiao (錢票, or "cash notes", which was a reference to their (initial) convertibility into strings of copper-alloy cash coins). In the year Xianfeng 3 (1853) the Ministry of Revenue also gave authorisation to the local provincial governments of China to directly issue notes denominated in copper-alloy cash coins and silver taels, these banknotes bore its official seal and were valid throughout the empire. The Great Qing Treasure Notes rather than being smoothly introduced to the local markets were "dumped" (Lanfa) on purveyors of goods and services to the bureaucracy of the Qing government and were not as easily accepted back in tax payments to the government by these same purveyors.

Unlike the Hubu Guanpiao tael notes, the Great Qing Treasure Note cash notes were initially well received by the Chinese market. While government reports indicate that the Great Qing Treasure Note would often be refused by private business owners and shops, they were fairly easily exchanged for the notes issued by the official banks. Because shops often refused them, the Great Qing Treasure Note cash notes were denominated in wén, instead of metropolitan cash (京錢, Jingqian), the currency unit commonly used on private banknotes in Beijing. The Great Qing Treasure Note could also be quite easily purchased from the official banks at a discount and be used to pay for taxes and the purchase of titles.

As the government of the Qing dynasty rather quickly realised that the notes denominated in copper-alloy cash coins were more popular than those denominated in silver, because of the relatively high nominal value of the latter, the imperial government began promoting the Great Qing Treasure Note more. In the year 1855 the government ramped up the production of cash notes and established 5 more Yu Group government banks for their exchange. The Yu banks had insufficient reserves to actually exchange the Great Qing Treasure Note cash notes for real copper, so they exchanged them for their own banknotes. Because the Yu banks had seriously over-issued their own banknotes compared to their very limited reserves, they would all close their doors in the year 1857.

The series from the third year of Xianfeng (1853) and successive issues of copper-alloy cash notes were issued in the denominations of 500 wén, 1000 wén, 1500 wén, and 2000 wén. Later as severe depreciation occurred within the new currency system which was brought on by inflation series higher denomination banknotes were issued. These included the denominations of 5,000 wén, 10,000 wén, 50,000 wén, and 100,000 wén which were issued from the year Xianfeng 6 until Xianfeng 9.

During this period 9 government banks in Beijing (of which 4 were newly established institutions) started issuing another type of cash note known as the Guanhao Qianpiao (官號錢票), these cash notes were backed by reserved kept in Daqian rather than standard cash coins. The Guanhao Qianpiao were modeled after privately produced banknotes known as the Sihao Qianpiao (私號錢票), these private cash notes would also continue to circulate alongside the new currencies. Both the Guanhao Qianpiao and Sihao Qianpiao were based on the Jingqian accounting unit of cash coins as was used in Beijing, this meant that for example of one were to exchange 15,000 wén worth of Guanhao Qianpiao or Sihao Qianpiao cash notes in the year 1861 that person would only receive 7500 wén worth of physical coins (or 750 cash coins of 10 wén to be more precise). This practice was asymmetrical as government documents noted a string of cash coins as 1000 wén while paying out only 500 wén for these cash notes.

The Great Qing Treasure Notes were supposed to enjoy circulation in all territories of the Qing dynasty. In order to facilitate this widespread adoption of the new paper currency the Great Qing Treasure Notes were issued to the general public through semi-official banks known as the Yu banks, Ch'ien banks, and T'ien bank groups, these semi-official banks served as the fiscal agents of the Ministry of Revenue. In reality, however, these banking groups were both independent from the Chinese government and from each other and weren't under any form of imperial government supervision. There were 5 "Yu Banks" which were already existing Chinese private banks, while the Ch'ien and T'ien banks were large cash shops which received a government license to distribute the new paper currency. The T'ien shops also fulfilled the purpose of being publicly funded pawnshops, they dealt in both pawned items and deposits. None of these institutions would survive the inflation, drowning in an ever-increasing sea of Great Qing Treasure Note cash notes. By the year Xianfeng 11 (1861) these institutions had all closed as they went bankrupt. The fall of the T'ien shops was quickened by Chinese peasants who, with the inflation affecting the paper money running rampant, opted to speedily redeem their pawned items with the depreciated Great Qing Treasure Note. This run on the T'ien shops had practically doomed the Chinese pawnshop business overnight.

As the Great Qing Treasure Note were intended to be used as a form of payment throughout the Manchu Empire, the government found it a necessity to try to bring them into circulation in the provinces by using the Yu, Ch'ien, and T'ien banking corporations. The entire process was spread over a biannual period, this was done because of the chaotic nature of China in the wake of this massive civil war.

In the capital city of Beijing the issuance of Great Qing Treasure Notes had exceeded over 15,000,000 strings of cash coins. Since local provincial officials tended to display a complete disregard and disdain for the idea of record keeping, no statistics regarding the issue of Great Qing Treasure Notes outside of Beijing has ever come to light. American numismatist John E. Sandrock speculates that these issues must have been comparable in number to, or greatly exceeded the number of cash coin-based notes issued in Beijing. In the provinces the central government tended to distribute Great Qing Treasure Notes into circulation by using both the civil service and the military. The salaries of civil servants and soldiers were partially paid in paper money, and by law, all cash shops and banks were required to accept the Great Qing Treasure Note copper notes in lieu of actual cash coins. Meanwhile, the central government itself allowed for the Chinese people to pay a part of their taxes in banknotes. However, the ability of the imperial Chinese government to try and force the Great Qing Treasure Note to circulate in the provinces was way more limited than its ability to do so in Beijing.

The Great Qing Treasure Note cash notes and Hubu Guanpiao tael notes weren't the only solutions the Chinese government offered to fix its financial crisis, but the actual implementation of these solutions varied greatly from province-to-province. Scholarly studies surrounding the effects around the introduction of these many new types of monies and what effect they had all played into the new monetary system, however, while the Great Qing Treasure Note cash notes and Hubu Guanpiao tael notes weren't actually convertible into hard currency they had a fixed rate to each other and did circulate throughout the Machu Empire.

The central government of the Qing dynasty became increasingly impatient with the slow adoption of the new paper currency in the provinces, in 1854 the Ministry of Revenue sent out a memorial to all provincial governors and governors-general to speed up the introduction and adoption processes.

"The Board of Revenue has already memorialized to order each province to open an official cash office and issue official notes, to increase the casting of copper and iron cash and the various denominations of big cash. Upon receipt of this memorial WE thereupon issued an edict fully authorizing this. Because there is a shortage of funds, the currency system depends entirely on the circulation of standard cash was well as other forms of money without obstruction, so that the money supply will be sufficient for the People's livelihood in difficult times. A long time has passed and WE have only received memorials from the governors general and governors of Fujian, Shaanxi, and Shanxi to state that they have acted in accordance with the edict. As for the rest of the provinces, they have by no means as yet done so. Those governors-general and governors, if they had with full devotion managed their affairs, what need would there be for a year's delay? Are not the regulations settled? Fujian is well known to be a barren place and yet the regulations are already in effect there. Even if the situation is not the same in each province, it cannot be so difficult to establish the law and arrange these affairs. In general, delinquent local officials fear difficulties and live in improper ease, idle and negligent, procrastinating. They are really to be bitterly hated. LET each province's governor-general, governor and military commander, and the governor of the imperial prefecture take official notice of the original memorial of the Board of Revenue and take part with their subordinates, deliberating over the local circumstances, and then quickly establish an official currency office and also devise means to raise funds to open mints to increase the casting so that the legal cash and cash notes, the one supplementing the other, are issued. At the same time deliberate on the rules and regulations and memorialize on what is being done."

— Ministry of Revenue (translated by John E. Sandrock).

Despite the memorial issued by the Ministry of Revenue, it is likely that local government officials were very much aware of how disruptive this monetary policy was and would lead to inflation. To many local government officials, the real issue at hand was actually with how much gaming the system they were able to get away with. The Great Qing Treasure Notes were convertible into Daqian cash coins at times, and while these multi-denominational cash coins were meant to circulate all over the Qing dynasty there isn't much evidence supporting that they also circulated in Beijing. Much of the central government's economic policies surrounded around making this new monetary system work and the practice of office selling would play a paramount role in this as the government would continue to accept both Great Qing Treasure Notes and Daqian cash coins in this endeavour.

Throughout the year Xianfeng 4 (1854) the imperial Chinese government attempted to find a solution to the fact that the Great Qing Treasure Note cash notes weren't being readily accepted on the market, which they finally found around the end of the year when a group of private merchants would offer the ability to make the government-issued cash notes convertible into privately produced banknotes which were also denominated in cash coins. 5 newly founded banks which were semi-private companies, known by the first syllable of their names as "Yu banks" (宇) received iron Daqian from the government's Iron Cash Bureau (鐵錢局). These banks started issuing their own banknotes. The amount of Great Qing Treasure Note cash notes which could be exchanged for banknotes issued by these Yu banks was dependent on lot (掣字) which was further divided into validated Great Qing Treasure Note cash notes known as "Sichao" (實鈔) and non-validated Great Qing Treasure Note cash notes known as "Kongchao" (空鈔). The Yu Banks would sometimes add a seal (or "chop") to validated Great Qing Treasure Note cash notes (which would increase their market value as they would be authenticated), though usually these would be exchanged for Yu Bank cash notes after which the Yu Banks would return these validated cash notes to the Ministry of Revenue and were brought back into general circulation in the form of military salaries. This procedure helped the soldiers of the banner armies, but would come at the expense of the convertibility of Hubu Guanpiao tael notes into Great Qing Treasure Note cash notes, which was suspended in order to protect the Great Qing Treasure Note series from being affected by further depreciation. Despite both denying silver notes and issuing their own cash notes in extreme excess of their actual reserves of cash coins, free Yu banks were still undercapitalised.

When the imperial Qing government allocated funds to the provinces, they were normally paid in either silver bullion and Hubu Guanpiao tael notes. In addition, Great Qing Treasure Note cash notes were printed specifically for the provinces, and imperial government made sure that these provincial Great Qing Treasure Note cash notes could not be used in the capital city; they would not be accepted in the official banks or in the payment of taxes.

As the Qing dynasty starting regaining territory in the areas held by the Taiping Heavenly Kingdom, they immediately started issuing Great Qing Treasure Note and Hubu Guanpiao banknotes in these places. These issues were controlled using two different ideogram systems for the indexes and prefixes, the Chinese characters utilised by these systems were based on the Thousand Character Classic (千字文, Qiānzì Wén). The prefixed Chinese character (which would appear in the series block preceding the actual serial number on each banknote) was actually one of these thousand classical ideograms, it is known that the first 320 characters from this series were reserved for the Peking Metropolitan District. By contrast, early Hubu Guanpiao tael notes of the Xianfeng era, which were issued through the Peking Metropolitan District, the provincial treasuries of China, and the Chinese military commissaries, used a different prefix character system, this system was based upon the Five Confucian Virtues as opposed to the thousand character classic-based system of the Great Qing Treasure Note. In the markets of Beijing the new Xianfeng banknotes could not be used, so as people could not purchase any actual goods with them in the capital market many Bannermen lost a large part of their disposable income because of this inability to actually purchase things with their salary.

The Shanxi and privately owned banks and the new banking corporations which had been established by the Chinese imperial government to be representative of the Chinese provincial treasuries were also assigned blocks of Chinese characters, which were to be placed in the prefix block on each banknote they would issue, thereby making it easy to identify every Great Qing Treasure Note banknote to a specific place where the paper note was issued.

=== Inflation ===
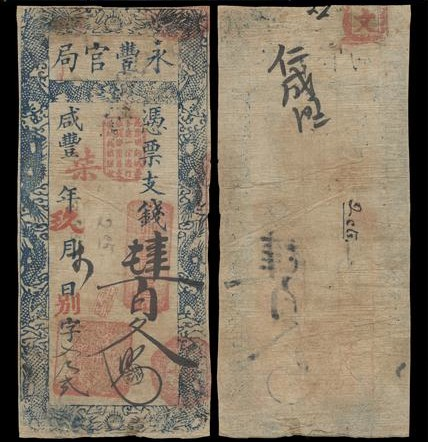
A privately produced banknote from Fujian of 400 wén issued in the year Xianfeng 7 (1857), in this year the Great Qing Treasure Note banknotes were worth only half of their nominal value when exchanged with these private banknotes.

Both the Hubu Guanpiao tael notes and Great Qing Treasure Note cash notes did not enjoy market preference because of their high nominal value: the lowest denomination Great Qing Treasure Note cash note had a nominal value of 500 wén, while the daily income in the period of 1853 to 1860 for an unskilled Chinese labourer was approximately 93 to 255 metropolitan cash (Jingqian).

At this point in time it became clear that physical metal supplies would not reach the capital of Beijing, the preferred substitute turned out to be banknotes. Government officials were very much aware that the issuing of banknotes had to happen within very strict limits because the increases to the supply of metal currencies needed to be matched or the new currency would face the same levels of inflation has had happened several times before in the history of China. Despite knowing all the risks and the predicted hyperinflation paired with many examples of historical precedent, the central government decided to pursue issuing more banknotes than they were able to back up because of the pressing matters of the Taiping Rebellion. In reality, there was no other means that the government of the Qing dynasty would be able to pay for the war and the inflation was a calculated risk deemed worth it. In the city of Beijing the parity between wén cash coins and the Great Qing Treasure Note was maintained, but at the same time the entirety of the Jingqian system would become deprecated in relation to the Zhiqian system and silver prices. Both 10 wén cash coins and Great Qing Treasure Note cash notes were heavily discounted when traded with privately issued banknotes. Around the same time the price of silver declined throughout China, by the year Xianfeng 6 (1856) it had declined to 50% its value of what it was in Xianfeng 2 (1852), the exchange rate between Jingqian and silver had increased by 192% and would go up to 300% only two years later. This was however, only reflected on the paper money market for private cash notes as government-issued cash notes continued to lose their value.

In the provinces of Zhili, Shanxi, Henan, and the region of Manchuria (Jilin, Fengtian, and Heilongjiang) in the north of China the circulation of the Great Qing Treasure Note banknotes was extensive, meanwhile these banknotes also enjoyed circulation in Central China where they vacillated with the spoils and fortunes of the war. The Great Qing Treasure Note banknotes tended not to circulate much in Southern China which (with the notable exception of Fujian) was a stronghold of the Taiping Heavenly Kingdom. The local authorities of the city of Fuzhou, Fujian also issued banknotes denominated in cash coins to the market, their reason was that there was a severe lack of cash coins circulating in the market at that time and that these banknotes would help alleviate this scarcity. The Fuzhou government often opted to pay using heavily debased cash coins, this happened to the extent that the copper reserves which backed this issue up had lost much of its value, which compounded inflationary pressures and justified the longstanding mistrust of paper money that the Chinese public had for the medium.

Initially, the Great Qing Treasure Note banknotes were able to be redeemed through the local Yu, Ch'ien and T'ien banks in a proportion of Zhiqian (制錢, "standard cash coins"), Daqian (大錢, "big cash"), silver, or the Hubu Guanpiao tael notes as was officially set by government regulation. As an example Manchu bannermen were to be paid in 8 parts ordinary cash coins to 2 parts large denomination cash coins, while members of the imperial household received 6 strings (串, chuàn) of standard cash coins for each 10 strings which were disbursed. Comparatively, government contractors and private merchants tended to receive more multi-denomination cash coins over standard cash coins due to their lower position. Under inflationary pressure the Chinese government wasn't able to maintain parity for its currencies. By the year Xianfeng 5 (1855) the majority of the high denomination cash coins were abolished because it was both being deprecated at a rapid paste and there was an epidemic of counterfeiting. At this point the higher denomination which still continued to be produced and circulate was the 10 wén cash coin, though it was only worth 70% of its nominal value on the market. During this period both the Great Qing Treasure Note and Hubu Guanpiao banknotes were worth only 50% their nominal value. Privately produced cash notes around the same time were fixed to the 10 wén Daqian and lost 60% of their value between the years 1852 and 1856. Both government issued banknotes and Yu Bank issued banknotes were only valued half that of privately issued banknotes in 1856.

The reserves that the government of the Qing dynasty had set aside for those who would redeem the Great Qing Treasure Note banknotes turned out to be too low to meet the demand. During some audits conducted by the Ministry of Revenue their turned out to be major irregularities with the reserves held by the private and provincial note issuing banks. Eventually, the Chinese government would abandon any policy other than one of keeping their banknotes in general circulation by forcing them on the Chinese population under a continued threat of punishments and penalties and also by making their redemption by its holders as difficult as possible. The complete crash of the new currency systems occurred during the winter of Xianfeng 6 (1856) all the way into Xianfeng 7 (1857). The iron 10 wén cash coin drastically declined in its value, one of the reasons for this was the fact that it was being counterfeited on a large scale. At this time both peasants and merchants from the province of Zhili stopped accepting the coin as a form of payment. After in the spring of Xianfeng 7 (1857) the convertibility of Hubu Guanpiao tael notes into Great Qing Treasure Note cash notes was partly restored by the lot method at the Yu banks. The Ministry of Revenue had attempted to stop the large scale counterfeiting and to force the provincial governments of China to start accepting both iron and copper-alloy Daqian cash coins and Great Qing Treasure Note cash notes for tax payments, but quickly abandoned proposing iron Daqian cash coins and settled on a cash coin system of iron 1 wén coins and copper-alloy 10 wén coins, this system would prevail until the year Xianfeng 10 (1860). Because of this the standard copper-alloy cash coins completely disappeared from the Chinese market while all standard prices kept using them as a base unit of account leading to a price increase of 500% when paying with Daqian cash coins and Great Qing Treasure Note cash notes. This had an immediate negative effect on the soldiers of the banner armies as the central government was forced to pay the soldiers in grain to prevent a famine. The collapse of the iron Daqian cash coins had an immediate effect on the Great Qing Treasure Note banknotes as large denomination iron cash coins served as the reserve of the cash notes issued by the Yu banks, which in turn handled the exchange of the Great Qing Treasure Note series. This resulted in the cash notes issued by the Yu banks to become quickly depreciated and by extend the Great Qing Treasure Note. The Yu banks went bankrupt and were forced to close their doors, this failure led to privately produced banknotes which were valued 4 times as much as the government-issued banknotes on the market further ushering in a decline for the Great Qing Treasure Note.

In the autumn of the year Xianfeng 7 (1857), a number of commercial banks were tasked with handling the exchange of the Great Qing Treasure Note and Hubu Guanpiao, this proved to be an unsuccessful endeavour so in the year Xianfeng 8 (1858) 4 of the 5 Yu banks were reopened under direct management by the Chinese government. The Yu banks would continue to exchange Great Qing Treasure Note banknotes into other cash notes, this time the exchanged cash notes weren't Yu bank cash notes but cash notes issued by the 9 remaining government banks. The lot validation system would continue until the year Xianfeng 10 (1860), it would be abolished due to the cessation of production of new government-issued banknotes. At the time when the validation system was abolished only a third of all Great Qing Treasure Note cash notes and 20% of all Hubu Guanpiao tael notes emitted in Beijing had actually been validated.

Due to their inability to be redeemed the Great Qing Treasure Note became widely depreciated, while it is common for 1000 wén banknotes from the year Xianfeng 3 (1853) to have so many stamps of endorsements that there was no more space for any more chops, a banknote of the same domination from the year Xianfeng 9 (1859) would have few if any endorsements. The value of the government-issued paper money was so depreciated by the year Xianfeng 10 (1860) that provincial issued were curtailed by this time. By Xianfeng 10 (1860) the rate between government-mandated cash notes and privately produced cash notes had become stable a rate of 2:1, this only increased to 3.5:1 before the monetary crash of 1861.

In March 1860, the Ministry of Revenue proposed to the Xianfeng Emperor to stop issuing both the Great Qing Treasure Note cash notes and Hubu Guanpiao tael notes and to cease validating old ones. By the year Xianfeng 11 (1861) the Great Qing Treasure Note experienced such severe deprecation that people auctioned it off for only 3% of their nominal value. At this time these banknotes would not be (or could not be) redeemed by the note issuing banks. In July of that year, it became common for labourers to reject them as their salary. In this year a run on the banks occurred. By September these banknotes ceased circulating in China altogether. While certain individuals such as government officials and foreigners would get the exact amounts of cash coins as stipulated on the banknotes, the average Chinese was forced into a highly competitive bidding market to receive any metal coinage. In these auctions, the person who was willing to exchange the largest number of paper banknotes for a certain number of high denomination cash coins would win. The repudiation of these Great Qing Treasure Note banknotes by the official banks and semi-official issuers such as private banks and pawnshops would condemn hordes of hardworking Chinese peasants to a life of never-ending impoverishment and misery.

The amount of endorsements on the reverse side of Great Qing Treasure Note banknotes also started to gradually decrease as the years passed by, while banknotes issued in years Xianfeng 3 and Xianfeng 4 were extensively endorsed indicating that widespread circulation, the banknotes issued in the years Xianfeng 5 and Xianfeng 6 often only contain a smaller number of endorsements on their backsides, but the banknotes issued in the years Xianfeng 7, Xianfeng 8, and Xianfeng 9 oftentimes lack any endorsements whatsoever indicating that in many cases these banknotes didn't circulate at all or weren't accepted by the general population including businesses and private banks anymore. Both the Great Qing Treasure Note cash notes and Hubu Guanpiao tael notes continued to be accepted in the practice of office selling and would continue to circulate in the provinces of China proper as non-interest bearing debentures until the years 1867–1868, when all government-issued banknotes were officially declared invalid.

In a 1962 study Yang Duanliu cited memorials which were written to the Xianfeng Emperor which attempted to show him that his order to the provinces to keep fifty percent of their reserves in silver was ignored by provincial authorities and that the actual ratio of reserves varied substantially across different provinces. Meanwhile, some Chinese provinces did not keep any silver reserves at all, while the province of Henan (a province very close to the capital city of Beijing) did not even accept the Hubu Guanpiao banknotes they themselves issued as a form of payment for provincial taxes. Yang claims that these inadequate reserve ratios and local insubordination to imperial government laws and edicts were to blame why by the year Qixiang 1 (1862) government banknotes had completely disappeared from circulation. Jerome Ch'ên meanwhile suggested that the Ministry of Revenue made the rampant inflation a lot worse by insisting that no more than half of individual tax remittance could be made with either Great Qing Treasure Note cash notes or Hubu Guanpiao tael notes with the remainder of the taxes being demanded in either cash coins or silver.

Niv Horesh suggests that the reason the Qing dynasty suffered from hyperinflation during the reign of the Xianfeng Emperor was not only because the banknotes issued by the government at the time were inadequately backed up by hard currency, but that the Xianfeng Emperor approved the issuance of heavily debased and ill-fated Daqian. Horesh blamed the 9,200,000 taels in war indemnities imposed on the Qing by foreign powers following the Opium Wars that were demanded from the Qing in March of the year 1850 as a strong motivation for the Xianfeng regime to start debasing its currency despite the fact that high denomination low intrinsic value cash coins have had a tainted reputation throughout Chinese history. In December 1850 a way larger threat to the rule of the Qing appeared in the form of a major civil war during the Taiping Rebellion meaning that the issuing of Daqian and paper currency were seen as a last-ditch emergency measure which the government had to undertake for its continued rule. According to Ch'ên many of the court officials that voiced their support for using banknotes were also in favour of issuing the Daqian and even iron cash coins as a means to alleviate the fiscal crisis as well as the general shortage of copper cash coins that were caused by the Taiping rebels expanding through Southeast China.

Following the fall of the Yu banks, the Great Qing Treasure Note cash notes were still issued after the year 1857 and could be exchanged in other official banks (Qian and Tian Groups), but in reality they were rarely seen in the market. In the year 1859, Great Qing Treasure Note cash notes could no longer be used to pay taxes. In 1860, the central government suspended the issue of Great Qing Treasure Note cash notes (as well as the use of Hubu Guanpiao tael notes), and ordered the gradual withdrawal of the existing paper from the market.

The government of the Qing dynasty's paper notes helped relieve the fiscal deficit by acting as a sort of forced loan from government employees. Through the exchange service of official government banks and the certainty that government issued paper notes could be used for tax payments, government debts became a kind of tradable loan (at a discount). With their limited number and limited use in the market, the Great Qing Treasure Note cash notes are unlikely to have been a major cause of the inflation in the Chinese market that had occurred at the time. However, the default on these government issued paper notes, and the ensuing market panic that had occurred may have been one of its causes.

Most Great Qing Treasure Note banknotes appearing on the market for collectors in the modern era tend to be these later issues with very few endorsements, these banknotes were introduced after the Great Qing Treasure Note series was already 90% deprecated.

=== Aftermath ===
There was a gradual return to the bimetallic traditional currency system and by the year 1861 all new currencies of the Xianfeng era were given up, with the notable exception being the 10 wén Daqian which continued to be produced until the abolition of cash coins themselves.

After the abolition of the Great Qing Treasure Note and the Hubu Guanpiao government notes the government of the Qing dynasty did not produce any notes anymore for decades. The final phase of Qing note issuance lasted from 1897 right until the Xinhai Revolution ousted the monarchy in 1912. These later issues were substantively different from the earlier two issues because, by then, notes had been imported from Western printers. These new notes were often horizontal-shaped in design which was novel in Chinese terms. Because of their horizontal designs and better security issues harder to forge by Chinese counterfeiters. The majority of these new banknotes were disbursed by semiofficial modern Chinese banks based on the models presented by Western and Japanese banks in China.

The Ministry of Revenue established a central bank, the Da-Qing Bank, in 1905. this bank would issue the last government-backed banknotes of the Qing dynasty until it was overthrown.

== List of banknotes denominated in copper-alloy cash coins issued during the Xianfeng era ==
List of banknotes denominated in copper-alloy cash coins issued during the Xianfeng era:

Xianfeng cash notes (1853–1859)
Denomination	Years of production	Approximate dimensions	Image
500 wén	Xianfeng 3–8	130 mm × 232 mm (5.1 in × 9.1 in)	
1000 wén	Xianfeng 3–8	138 mm × 240 mm (5.4 in × 9.4 in)	
1500 wén	Xianfeng 4	126 mm × 233 mm (5.0 in × 9.2 in)	
2000 wén	Xianfeng 3–9	138 mm × 245 mm (5.4 in × 9.6 in)	
5000 wén	Xianfeng 6–9	138 mm × 247 mm (5.4 in × 9.7 in)	
10,000 wén	Xianfeng 7–9	141 mm × 248 mm (5.6 in × 9.8 in)	
50,000 wén	Xianfeng 7–9	147 mm × 267 mm (5.8 in × 10.5 in)	
100,000 wén	Xianfeng 7–9	145 mm × 277 mm (5.7 in × 10.9 in)	

== Misattribution in English language sources ==
Strictly speaking, the Xianfeng era banknotes issued by the official banks did not fall under the monies issued by the Qing government. However, the status and function of official banks was intertwined with that of the Daqian, Great Qing Treasure Note, and Hubu Guanpiao, and the over-issue of banknotes by the official banks was probably the real reason for the Xianfeng inflation. Because the official banks were neither directly controlled by the Ministry of Revenue or supervised by them, and the fact that their operations were semi-commercial (as in they were operated by private merchants), few records of official banknotes exist today. In fact, it has not become uncommon for modern English language literature on the subject to claim that the Great Qing Treasure Note were in fact issued by the official banks. In reality both the Hubu Guanpiao and the Great Qing Treasure Note were issued by the Ministry of Revenue, while official banknotes, which were also often denominated in copper-alloy cash coins, were distinct. In his book Money and Monetary Policy in China King confuses the Great Qing Treasure Note with the official banknotes.

King mentions that the Hubu Guanpiao tael notes were the direct responsibility of the Ministry of Revenue while the Great Qing Treasure Note cash notes were issued through the official banks which were the fiscal agents of the Ministry of Revenue. But, in fact, both the Hubu Guanpiao tael notes and Great Qing Treasure Note cash notes were issued by the Ministry of Revenue, and the official banks were tasked with and responsible for accepting the notes (mostly Great Qing Treasure Note cash notes) in exchange for Daqian or their own banknotes. According to Xun Yan of the London School of Economics and Political Science it seems that King had mixed up Great Qing Treasure Note cash notes with the banknotes issued by the official banks, because of their close relationship.

== Design, security features, and design elements ==
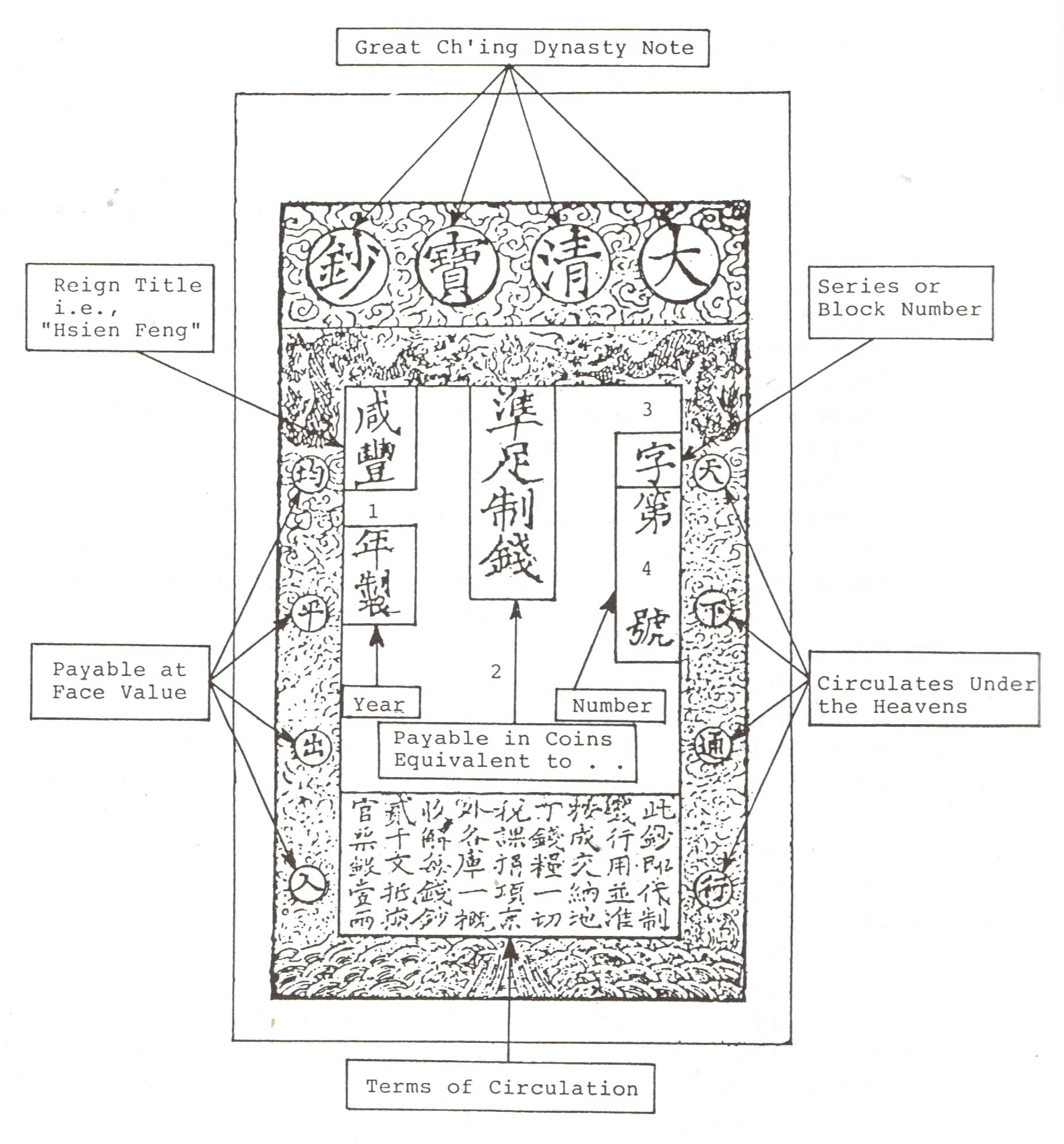
The layout of the Great Qing Treasure Note

The handmade paper which was used to produce both the Great Qing Treasure Note cash notes and Great Qing Hubu Guanpiao tael notes was sized, the paper itself may have been produced in Northern China or Korea. The paper can be described as being hard, thin, and a bit yellowish in colour, while the texture could be described as being lumpy. The design of the banknotes was uniform, this suggests that the imperial Chinese government would have probably distributed them to the provincial note-issuing banks and offices itself.

American numismatist John E. Sandrock examined the Great Qing Treasure Note banknotes produced during the years Xianfeng 7 (1857), Xianfeng 8 (1858), and Xianfeng 9 (1859) after which he concluded that the banknotes denominated in 1000 wén and 2000 wén were printed in two varieties of paper. He noted that the Great Qing Hubu Guanpiao tael notes were made from a much heavier and thicker kind of paper which he also described as being softer to the touch of ones hands – almost blotter-like in quality. The paper used for these Great Qing Hubu Guanpiao tael notes is full of large, stringy fibers, which Sandrock thought was most probably made from bamboo. Some of the Great Qing Treasure Note cash coins with the denominations of 1000 wén and 2000 wén were made from the same type of paper as the Great Qing Hubu Guanpiao tael notes. John E. Sandrock speculates that because the larger denominations of 5,000 wén, 10,000 wén, 50,000 wén, and 100,000 wén were not authorised to be created until the years Xianfeng 6 (1856) and Xianfeng 7 (1857), that by the year Xianfeng 6 the imperial Chinese government the paper used to produce the cash notes may have run out or that the contract for it may have been canceled. When these larger denomination Great Qing Treasure Note cash notes were authorised, they must have been printed on whatever paper was available at the time for the Chinese government.

The Great Qing Treasure Note contained the following text at the bottom:

此鈔即代制
錢行用並准
按成交納地
丁錢糧一切
稅課捐項京
外各庫一概
收解每錢鈔
貳千文抵換
官票銀壹兩 Cǐ chāo jí dài zhì qián xíng yòng, bìng zhǔn àn chéngjiāo nà de dīng qiánliáng, yīqiè shuì kè juān xiàng, jīng wài gè kù yīgài shōu jiě, měi qián chāo èrqiān wén dǐ huàn guān piào yín yī liǎng.

This text shows that the fixed conversion rate between Great Qing Treasure Note banknotes and silver taels was 2000 wén for 1 tael.

Both the thick and thin versions of these banknotes have line watermarks, watermark lines found on the Great Qing Treasure Note cash notes consisted of horizontal bars with thick, continuous lines that were spaced approximately 18 millimeters apart from each other, meanwhile, there were other watermarks which formed a grid pattern. These watermarks were not a good security feature as they were prone to be overlooked. Many Great Qing Treasure Note banknotes had rather indistinct line watermarks, while these watermarks appeared more prominently in others. John E. Sanrock observed a rather particularly distinct example of Great Qing Treasure Note watermarks on a specimen of a 100,000 wén banknote. This particular note contains 7 heavy, vertical and 13 horizontal lines interspersed with some smaller horizontal lines between them.

The Chinese at the time manufactured ink from various plant substances which they mixed with coloured earths and soot. This resulted in a deep black ink which had both an excellent colour and strength and was of high quality. This was ink used to provide the variable data on notes, such as the date, the serial number, among others were all applied with a paintbrush. Today the ink which was applied to the Great Qing Treasure Note appears almost as fresh as the day that the characters were written down because of its high quality. The blue printing inks which was used in the block printing process was of similar quality and also appear very clearly today. Meanwhile, the vermilion ink which was used to impress the various authenticating seals (or chops) upon the banknotes also depict both a good colour and penetration of the paper. Comparatively the inks which were used on the earlier Great Ming Treasure Notes from the Ming dynasty, for example, tended to dry out and would become brittle and flake off leaving often only traces in many cases.

John E. Sandrock suspects that the wooden blocks from which the Great Qing Treasure Note cash notes were printed were most likely also carved in the location of where these cash notes were issued, since he noted that upon a close examination of a number of them, these banknotes reveal quite a number of prominent differences among them. He noted that in some cases that different Chinese characters are used for conveying the same intended meaning, in other cases different systems of numbering were utilised depending on place of issue, and in others the physical dimensions of similar or the same ideograms (Chinese characters) differ between them.

Contained within 4 circles at the top of every banknote are the characters "鈔寶清大" (written from right to left) printed in light blue ink. Meanwhile, the later seals and stamps placed by the Ministry of Revenue were in vermilion or orange and tended to be 57 x 57 millimeters in size. Beneath the top inscription there is a rectangular border, which serves as a frame, across the top of which there are two Chinese dragons striving for a wish-granting pearl. The side frames depict clouds interrupted by circular medallions containing the Chinese characters "天下通行" (T'ien Hsia T'ung Hsing, "To circulate under the heavens") (Note: Note that the Chinese mandate of heaven stipulated that the Chinese Emperor ruled over the entire world.) on the right and the characters "巧平出入" (Chun P'ing Ch'u Ju, "Payable at face value") on the left.

Except for the denomination of the Great Qing Treasure Note, which was carved into the block and was therefore printed into the design itself, all other variables on the paper such as block and serial numbers as well as the chops of minor officials, tended to be applied using black ink. At the upper left part of the Great Qing Treasure Note, the reign title of the Xianfeng Emperor was printed with the year that the banknote was produced, on the other side the serial number could be seen.

A common design on both copper-alloy cash coin Great Qing Treasure Note banknotes and silver tael Hubu Guanpiao banknotes, as well as many later issues of banknotes, was that of how the Chinese saw the universe, this revolved around the Chinese concept of earth (the ground), the seas, and the heavens (the skies). This tradition and philosophy is expressed as a landscape showing a high mountain which is encircled by water, while above this mountain is a border containing the clouds and Chinese dragons. This symbolism to the Chinese conveyed the idea that the Emperor of China, as the Son of Heaven, was the rightful ruler of the entire universe. On the Great Qing Treasure Note banknotes specifically coral could be observed ascending from the water, coral is considered to be one of the mythological seven precious jewels. Another common treasure depicted on these banknotes is the wish-granting pearl (or sometimes a fireball) being chased by two Chinese dragons. The presence of coral and the wish-granting pearl is meant to represent wealth.

As the Great Qing Treasure Note was associated with the lower class peasantry it depicted only two Chinese dragons, while the Hubu Guanpiao, which was associated with the upper class, contained four Chinese dragons.

An important security feature of these banknotes were camel's hair brush strokes found at the right edges of the Great Qing Treasure Note. These black ink strokes were actually already made prior to the cutting of the notes from their tallies in an attempt to prevent counterfeit currency from being produced as it was the best-known security feature available at the time. These brush strokes would overlap with the counterfoil that remained in the tally kept by the issuing government or Nam official when the banknote was cut and later removed. As these brush strokes contained hundreds of very small hairlines which together formed random patterns, they were not dissimilar from individual human fingerprints since it was highly unlikely that any two followed the same patterns. These banknotes were testified to be genuine or false by comparing two halves and the serial number, the banknote could only be declared genuine if the patterns matched. John E. Sandrock has claimed to only have seen a single Great Qing Treasure Note which did not have this security feature.

According to the American numismatist Andrew McFarland Davis different Chinese characters tended to be used to convey the same meaning on different banknotes. For example, while some banknotes had the insulation that those who informed the government of counterfeiting practices would receive a reward, other banknotes included a line where it was suggested that to receive the reward you had to physically bring the counterfeiters in for arrest.

== Seals, overprints, and endorsements ==
Three kinds of stamps were used on Chinese banknotes, these were "seals", "overprints", and "endorsements". In general, seals were affixed by the issuing government authority with an official position. Overprints were added later after the banknote had already been placed into general circulation, overprints were the products of semi-officials who had some nominal form of authority the merchant class did not have. Endorsements represent acceptance of the Great Qing Treasure Note banknote as genuine and were generally placed on the reverse side (or blank side) of the banknote by the many cash shops, T'ien shops, and money changers through whose hands they would pass. The official seals which were placed on Qing dynasty era banknotes tended to serve a large variety of purposes. These government stamps were large or small, square or round, or oblong, they ware usually orange, vermilion, or wine-red in colour although certain seals also appear in black, they tended to be impressed on various parts of the banknote where there was space. The impression of an official seal proves the authenticity of the banknote, it also signified imperial Chinese authority, since every government official in China obtained his seal from the Chinese emperor. These Chinese seals are always bilingual and are written in both Chinese and Manchu scripts.

In the centre of the Great Qing Treasure Note banknotes large vermilion seals were affixed to acknowledge that the specimen in question was authentic. The additional seals affixed on these banknotes are always positioned at either the left or right side of the note so that only a partial impression of the seal is visible.

An extra round orange coloured seal may be seen at the top-right edge of all Great Qing Treasure Note cash notes. This seal is a pictograph in its form and at all times found to be only partially impressed on the paper. The purpose of these seals is not known to the American numismatist John E. Sandrock who suggested that this orange seal may have acted as a type of warning to those wishing to counterfeit these banknotes.

Great Qing Treasure Notes with the denominations of 500 wén, 1000 wén, 1500 wén, and 2000 wén also tended contain seals which were black in colour and oblong in shape, these tended to be located at the left center of the note beneath the Xianfeng era reign year and the date of issue. These seals served as the signature seals of the semi-officials who were in charge of noting the date of emission on the face of the note. Additionally all Hubu Guanpiao tael notes tend to carry the same oblong black seal on their face, however; those found on the Great Qing Treasure Note copper-alloy cash notes have a large variation and look more picturesque. The practice of placing these seals seems to have been abandoned after the introduction of denominations higher than 2000 wén in the year Xianfeng 6.

== See also ==
- Dangbaekjeon
- Tenpō Tsūhō
- Tự Đức Bảo Sao

== Sources ==
- Dai Zhiqiang (戴志強), ed. (2008). Zhongguo qianbi shoucang jianshang quanji (中國錢幣收藏鑒賞全集) (Changchun: Jilin chuban jituan). (in Mandarin Chinese).
- Von Glahn, R. (2005) The origins of paper money in China. In: Goetzmann WN, Geert Rouwenhorst K (eds) The origins of value: the financial innovations that created modern capital markets. Oxford University Press, Oxford.
- King, Frank H.H. (1965). Money and Monetary Policy in China, 1845–1895. Cambridge, Massachusetts: Harvard University Press.
- Meng Peingxing (孟彭興) (1998). "Cong feiqian dao jiaozi huizi (從“飛錢”到“交子”、“會子”), in Zhang Dainian (張岱年), ed. Zhongguo wenshi baike (中國文史百科) (Hangzhou: Zhejiang renmin chubanshe), Vol. 1, 414. (in Mandarin Chinese).
- Peng Xinwei (彭信威) (1954 [2007]). Zhongguo huobi shi (中國貨幣史) (Shanghai: Qunlian chubanshe), 580–581, 597–605. (in Mandarin Chinese).
- Peng Zeyi (彭澤益) (1983). "1853–1868 nian de Zhongguo tonghuo pengzhang 1853–1868 (年的中國通貨膨脹)". In Peng Zeyi (彭澤益) (ed.). Shijiu shiji houbanqi Zhongguo de caizheng yu jingji (十九世紀后半期中國的財政與經濟) (in Chinese). Beijing: Renmin chubanshe.
- Xie Tianyu 謝天宇, ed. (2005). Zhongguo qianbi shoucang yu jianshang quanshu (中國錢幣收藏與鑒賞全書) (Tianjin: Tianjin guji chubanshe), Vol. 2, 508. (in Mandarin Chinese).
- Zhang, Dechang (1970). Life of a Qing Mandarin in Beijing. Hong Kong: Chinese University of Hong Kong Press.
- Zhou Fazeng (周發增), Chen Longtao (陳隆濤), Qi Jixiang (齊吉祥), ed. (1998). Zhongguo gudai zhengzhi zhidu shi cidian (中國古代政治制度史辭典) (Beijing: Shoudu shifan daxue chubanshe), Pages 372, 375, 380, 381, 382. (in Mandarin Chinese).
