= Hubu Guanpiao =

Series of Qing Dynasty banknotes

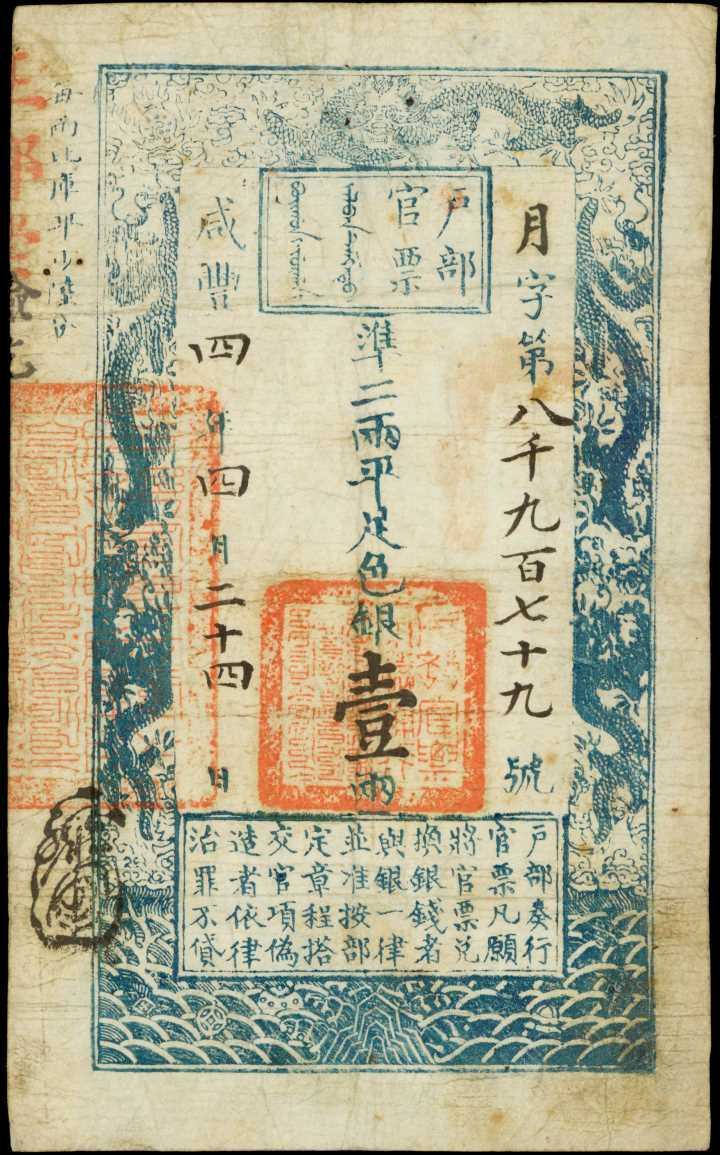
A Xianfeng era Great Qing Hubu Guanpiao (大清戶部官票, dà qīng hù bù guān piào) of 1 liǎng (壹兩).

The Hubu Guanpiao (Traditional Chinese: 戶部官票, "Ministry of Revenue Government notes") is the name of two series of government notes produced by the Qing dynasty, the first series was known as the Chaoguan (鈔官) and was introduced under the Shunzhi Emperor during the Qing conquest of the Ming dynasty but was quickly abandoned after this war ended, it was introduced amid residual ethnic Han resistance to the Manchu invaders. These government notes were produced on a small scale, amounting to 120,000 strings of cash coins annually, and only lasted between 1651 and 1661. After the death of the Shunzhi Emperor in the year 1661, calls for resumption of note issuance weakened, although they never completely disappeared.

Over the course of its 268 years, the central government of the Qing dynasty (1644–1912) issued traditional Chinese paper money (vertically printed) only twice. The second time was included the second series of the Hubu Guanpiao which was introduced under the Xianfeng Emperor in response to the high military expenditures there government had to spend during the Taiping Rebellion, this second series was introduced alongside the copper-alloy cash coins-based Great Qing Treasure Note (大清寶鈔) notes.

However, the government did not keep adequate reserves of hard currency to back the new notes up and many provincial governments did not allow for taxes to be paid using paper money, after a few years the government started refusing to convert the new paper money into hard currency and the Chinese people started to distrust it as a valid medium of exchange. In response to the ever more expensive military expenditures because of the Taiping Rebellion the government started producing more and more high denomination notes which were not convertible causing hyperinflation, in the year Xianfeng 8 (1858) the government completely depreciated the Hubu Guanpiao series in favour of the Great Qing Treasure Note.

By the year Xianfeng 9 (1859) the Great Qing Treasure Note had also become completely depreciated and was ultimately abolished.

== Early issues ==
During the transition from Ming to Qing the Manchu government issued government notes known as Hubu Guanpiao (戶部官票) or Shunzhi Guanpiao (順治官票) or Shunzhi Chaoguan (順治鈔貫) which were first issued in the year 1651 on initiative of the Minister of Revenue, Wei Xiangshu (魏象樞) during the war with the remnants of the Ming dynasty to cover the more immediate expenses of the Manchus as the finances of the Qing during this period were in dire distress, these notes were declared void only a decade after their issued. An annual amount of 128,000 guàn (貫) were issued, with a total sum of 1.28 million guàn being produced before they were abolished. The denominations of the Hubu Guanpiao followed the pattern of the Great Ming Treasure Note issued by the Ming dynasty, but as historiographical sources about the early Qing era paper money are scarce, not much can be known about them. After the Hubu Guanpiao it was only rarely suggested by court officials to reintroduce paper money to the Qing Empire, among these were Cai Zhiding (蔡之定) in 1814 and Wang Yide (王懿德) in his treatise on money known as Qianbi Chuyan (錢幣芻言).

Peng Xinwei suggested that the Manchu rulers of the Qing were very much atavistic towards the inflationary pressure that the earlier Jurchen Empire experienced after they had abused their ability to print Jiaochao notes. Modern scholars argue that the notes issued during the Shunzhi period, while only brief, likely entrenched the reluctance of the Qing dynasty to issue government notes because this issue also proved inflationary confirming their fears.

It has been suggested by Taiwanese economic historian Lin Man-houng that Chinese money shops did not start with the production of their own private notes until the end of the Qianlong period, these shops were very likely to have been more developed in Northern China, where these money shops produced notes which were mostly denominated in cash coins while notes from Southern China tended to be denominated in taels of silver. It is also possible that private-order notes could have emerged earlier in the 18th century and that their presence would become very common by the 1820s.

== Xianfeng era ==
The Xianfeng era Hubu Guanpiao (戶部官票) tael-based government notes were created out of the same situation that created the Great Qing Treasure Note (大清寶鈔) cash coins-based notes, with the main difference being in what form of currency these notes could be redeemed in.

=== Economic and monetary background ===
The precursor of paper money (紙幣) known as "flying cash" were issued by the Tang dynasty; however, these bills of exchange could in no way be considered to be a form of paper money as they were not meant to be a medium of exchange and were only negotiable between two distant points. The first true paper money in the world was issued under the Song dynasty, these were promissory notes issued by merchants in Sichuan known as the Jiaozi, under the reign of Emperor Zhenzong (997–1022) the government of the Song dynasty granted a monopoly for the production of Jiaozi notes to sixteen wealthy merchants in Sichuan, as these merchants were slow to redeem their notes and inflation started affecting these private notes the government nationalised paper money in the year 1023 under the Bureau of Exchange. As these paper notes were backed by the government they were instantly successful and the people regarded them to be equally trustworthy as cash coins, other types of paper notes issued under the Song dynasty include the Huizi and the Guanzi. Before the Mongol Empire conquered China the Jin dynasty also issued paper money.

Before the establishment of the Ming dynasty the Mongol Yuan dynasty had suffered from a severe case of hyperinflation which made the paper money issued by them worthless. Under the reign of the Yuan dynasty copper cash coins remained in circulation with the inscriptions Zhida Tongbao (至大通寶), Dayuan Tongbao (大元通寶), and Zhizheng Tongbao (至正通寶) forming the majority of the circulating issues and "strings of cash coins" remaining a currency unit. Silver then started to occupy a paramount place in the Mongol economy and was supplemented by government issued paper money. Under the reign of Kublai Khan the Zhongtong Jiaochao (中統交鈔) was issued whose value was based on the fabric silk. Under the reign of Külüg Khan in the year 1308 the Zhiyuan Baochao (至元寶鈔) was issued which was supplemented with the silver-based Zhida Yinchao (至大銀鈔), but these circulated only for a year. The final series of paper money issued by the government of the Yuan dynasty from 1350 were the Zhizheng Jiaochao (至正交鈔). A major difference between how paper money was used under the Mongols and under the Song dynasty was that, in certain regions of the Yuan dynasty, paper notes were the only acceptable form of currency and could not be exchanged in either copper cash coins or silver sycees. Exchanging paper money into copper or silver was known as duìxiàn (兌現, "convert into specie") which was the main reason why earlier forms of paper money were deemed reliable. As these regions were completely dependent on paper money inflation hit them more severely as their notes could not be converted into a currency based on any intrinsic value, for this reason the Mongols allowed their subjects to continue using copper-alloy cash coins and issued new ones every now and then. During the last few decades of the Yuan dynasty the inflation caused people to lose their trust in paper money and barter became the most common means of exchange.

During the beginning of Manchu rule over China in the year 1644, the total imperial revenues of the Qing dynasty were an approximated 30,000,000 taels. Imperial Government expenditures at the time were correspondingly modest. During the balanced periods in Qing dynasty history of the 17th and 18th centuries imperial revenue consistently exceeded government expenditures, which resulted in a tidy cash surplus in the Imperial Chinese Treasury. The vastness of China created poor communications across government offices and a general looseness of administration encouraged all sorts of irregularities across the country. During the course of the Taiping Rebellion China would see a third of its people die utterly devastating its economy in the process. Of China's 18 wealthiest provinces 12 were left in ruins, this would put a heavy strain on the resources of the government of the Qing dynasty putting it near breaking point as the rebellion had sown the seeds for further calamities which would hurt the economy of China even more and ultimately led to the downfall of the Qing dynasty during the next century. The main source of income for the government of the Qing dynasty was taxation.

The Taiping Rebellion was the largest civil war that China had experienced up until that point. The Qing dynasty Army of the Green Standard and its bannermen had long since fallen into decay, revealing the decrepit state of the Chinese military. Near the end of the year 1851, the Ministry of Revenue in Beijing promulgated the Statutes for Raising Military Funds (餉事例). After repeated defeats on the field of battle suffered by the Chinese government, new armies and new types of armies had to be raised. For this task, the Emperor was forced to turn to the provinces. Eventually, the imperial Chinese government had no recourse other than to place full responsibility in these newly formed units led by local warlords and aristocrats. Zeng Guofan, the architect of eventual victory over the Taiping Heavenly Kingdom, was given unprecedented powers in this pursuit. By January of the year 1862 conditions had worsened. Zeng's troops now only received 40% of their pay, and even so, payment fell as much as 15 months behind. Desertions now began occurring for the first time in 9 years of fighting. The government withdrew from conventional modes of centralised war financing as it has been proven ineffective. In turn, it allowed the Chinese provinces a greater flexibility in raising revenues than before, mainly by greatly expanding office selling, a time-honored Chinese fiscal emergency measure of the Ministry of Revenue in the capital city but this was never used on such a scale by provincial and military administrations. The offices being sols were those of jiansheng (監生) and gongsheng (貢生).

Silver ingots known as sycees have been a part of the Chinese monetary system since around the Tang and Song dynasties, but due to the natural scarcity of silver in China were rare and the use of silver currency was limited to the upper classes of Chinese society and their use was to be given as tribute, to pay bribes, to give away as gifts, silver sycees were also used as a method of transporting large funds over long distances as well as for hoarding wealth, and was used by the government to pay military expenses. This all changed when the Ming dynasty started trading with the Portuguese during the 16th century, large amounts of European silver would enter the trading port of Guangzhou leading to a large surplus of the metal in China as merchants began using silver to pay their taxes with. The amounts of silver flowing in increased dramatically after the Qing dynasty was forced to open more ports following the Opium Wars. Since the circulating silver sycee in China was rarely of the same degree of fineness, a standard unit of account had to be devised, this unit of exchange for accounting silver came to be known in English as the "tael" (which is pronounced the same as the English word "tail").

The tael itself was not a form of currency, but rather a weight used to represent one pure ounce of commercial silver. As China was a rather large country where local customs tended to vary widely, an ounce would oftentimes in one place not necessarily be an ounce in another part of China. Consequently, a large variety of different scales were employed all over China by different trades, each of these scales varying somewhat from the other scales that were used in different fields of commerce.

The Xianfeng Emperor cannot be completely blamed for the monetary crisis the Qing dynasty experienced during this era. The monetary policy of the Qing government had been effective for over 160 years, yet under the Daoguang Emperor's reign, which preceded that of Xianfeng, inherent problems to the system were becoming evident. 3 principal issues with the system arose. First, cash coinage became debased due to dishonest officials and the failure of the copper supply dependent on the copper mines of Yunnan which had been interdicted by the rebels. Secondly, the Chinese silver sector, with its system of Loofang (which was the private smelting of sycees), was never able to adequately fulfil the demands of Chinese commercial sector; and thirdly, the Qing dynasty was ruled by a government which proved incapable of enforcing the monetary policy which had worked so well for previous dynasties. All these factors reached a climax around the year Xianfeng 3 (1853). By this time the rebel armies of the Taiping Heavenly Kingdom had conquered the city of Nanjing and established their capital there. Which called for measures beyond traditional solutions.

By the time of this occurrence, the imperial Chinese treasury was as good as empty. Zeng Guofan realized that his army could not survive off the land in rebel infested Anhui, Jiangsu, and Zhejiang provinces. Since the around the end of the year 1858 Jiangxi province had been molested very little by the Taiping rebels, Zeng became dependent upon the province of Jiangxi for his military supplies and made its defense an essential part of his counter-rebellion strategy. The main sources of income of the province at the time were agriculturally based; however, the collection of statistical data collected by the bureaucratic apparatus upon which the taxation system was based was often completely disrupted during Taiping incursions into the area, thus depriving the Ministry of Revenue of its base upon which to collect these taxes. This resulted that land taxes and grain tributes which were the 2 principal sources of revenue, were in large measure not paid to the central government in Beijing. additionally, taxes that were collected were often diverted to the local provincial treasuries to defray provincial military expenses. To make up in part for these losses, the lijin tax was introduced. During the entire Taiping Rebellion there were never sufficient funds to run the Chinese government and pay the army to crush the rebellion.

These taxes collected by the imperial Chinese government took many different forms; the most important of which were the land tax system, the grain tribute, the imperial customs revenue system, the tax on the salt monopoly, lijin, and miscellaneous taxes and duties imposed on the people. From ancient times the land tax had produced up to two thirds of the Chinese government's total revenue. In China, historically all land within its territory was considered to be the property of the Emperor, the monarch having acquired it through conquest. How this land was used, however, was left to those that occupied and lived on it in return for a yearly tax based upon the rental value of the land in question. In the year 1713 the Kangxi Emperor had fixed the rent collected by the imperial Chinese government at ¾ tael per 6 mou (or 1 acre) of land and issued a decree that this ratio should stand for all time unchanged. From time to time however the actual land tax collected by the Chinese government was reduced in some areas where necessary as a result of natural disasters such as floods and earthquakes and human disasters such as rebellions and insurrections.

The Chinese provinces most devastated by the Taiping Rebellion which were Anhui, Zhejiang, Henan, Jiangxi, Jiangsu, Guizhou, and Sichuan enjoyed a governmental sanctioned "tax break" for decades due to the destruction that was wreaked upon them by the Taiping Rebellion. This "tax break" accounted for much loss of imperial government revenue which it had previously gained from those provinces. The proceeds of the land tax money collected during this era at the provincial level were substantially decreased. Severe irregularities and mass extortion commonly took place on the part of local tax collectors.

The second most important tax collected by the imperial Chinese government was the grain tribute. Yearly quotas were set, but these quotas were limited to only the 15 provinces with fertile soil which were all situated along the basin of the Yangtze River. The quotas set up by the Imperial Chinese government were assessed based upon local grain productivity in these provinces.

The Chinese government levered duties on customs and goods which entered China since ancient times dating to the same era as the land era. With the forced opening of the Qing dynasty's doors after the Opium Wars and the following increase in maritime trade with foreign nations, the customs duties took on a vastly expanded level of importance in the Chinese taxation system. Before the year 1854 the same rather lax administration and sleight of hand was practiced with the collection of the import customs as the Chinese government exercised with the land tax. In September 1853 an event happened which would change the way these customs were collected forever, and in the process this event resulted transforming the Chinese maritime customs into a competent and highly efficient force for acquiring tax revenue for the Chinese government. In September of the year 1853 the Taiping rebels, fighting their way down the Yangtze valley while leaving a lot of destruction in their wake, threatened the port city of Shanghai. The loyal Chinese government officials lost no time in fleeing to Shanghai's International Settlement which was protected by guns of foreign warships stationed there. The Customs House of Shanghai by this time had been abandoned. Foreign traders and businessmen, refusing to pay duties to unauthorized Chinese officials, came to declare their imported goods instead to their representative consulates in the city until the Chinese Customs House could be reopened. This resulted to a considerable amount of workload for these foreign consulates, as the funds raised through customs duties were based upon a 5% ad valorem tax on all imports and exports in Shanghai. The foreign consular officials, who were unable to cope with this high volume, set up the Maritime Customs Service to be run by British, American, and French consular representatives and gave this office the task of collecting all customs duties on traded goods. As at the time only the British inspector was able to speak Mandarin Chinese, he was handed the office of the Inspector General. It was very rare for contemporary Chinese merchants who came into the Shanghai International Settlement to have had any prior contact with Western people. These people now could now observe western business practices and their administration at very close quarters. Some of these refugees who fled into the International Settlement were quick to realise that their country would benefit if China was to follow the West's example. These impressions of foreign business acumen gained during this era, together with cooperation arising out of need in this chaotic time in Chinese history, would lead to the creation of the first native Chinese modern shipping companies and similar business enterprises. The Imperial Maritime Customs was organised so well that it would become a model of efficiency, so efficient in fact that the British would never relinquish their control of this system during imperial China, the Manchus would continue this arrangement to the end of the Qing dynasty.

Since ancient times in China the salt trade was treated as a government monopoly. John E. Sandrock described the administration of this commodity to be "so complicated, that by comparison, it would make a Rubik's cube look like mere child's play." As the commodity of salt was not uniformly distributed throughout Chinese territory, China was divided into many districts in an attempt to equalise natural conditions in various places. A timetable of tax collection was composed such as the Chinese salt traffic would bear. Consumers near the sea were taxed much higher, for example, this fact would be motivational to everyone to inspire them to evaporate their own salt, while in places where no salt was produced too high a tax would drive consumption down thereby reducing the revenues made. By this act of fine-tuning the Chinese salt tax, the Imperial Treasury of China kept up a steady flow of income of significant proportions.

The 5th of the imperial revenue sources was also by far the most diversified. These were the "miscellaneous taxes and duties", this category included everything imaginable to be taxed. There were separate taxes on deeds, wine, tobacco, tea, sugar, and timber to list a few. Operating a business was taxed. There was a mining tax mining, a butcher tax, a pawnshop tax, and a fishing tax. In reality, only very little has actually changed over the years. Duties were levied on goods such as grain, silk, cattle, wagons, oil, cotton, camels, bamboo, sulfur, cloth among others. Despite the large range of the above taxes and duties, each tax in and of itself was very minor and of small consequence to the individual in China, however in the aggregate, it was of great significance to the Chinese government. Collecting and accounting for this diverse revenue constituted a real nightmare of administration for imperial Chinese government tax agencies.

As a way to enhance the revenue the Chinese government introduced the Lijin tax (釐金, "a contribution of a thousandth" in Mandarin Chinese, or 1‰) which would prove to be very successful; however, this tax severely hampered trade and commence. The lijin was a tax imposed upon traded commodities. Lijin collection points were established along all highways and waterways in China. Additionally, the lijin tax was collected at every border crossing between Chinese provinces and at all city gates. Lumber originating on the upper Yalu River and bound for the capital city of Beijing has to pass through no less than 68 inspection stations to be taxed. The lijin collected added no less than 17% to the cost of this material. The lijin tax limited the amount collected in any one province to 10%. The tolls collected on passing commodities substantially slowed the flow of business within China. The lijin system would survive the fall of the Qing dynasty as it was a major source of revenue. The lijin tax would constitute the principal source of income for the Chinese provinces and was most essential to the military operations conducted by Zeng Guofan. The Ministry of Revenue assigned which funds had to be sent to the central government in Beijing and which could be retained for local provincial use. The fact that, at times, the military payment of provincial troops was 8 to 9 months in some areas established that the money more often went to Beijing than to the coffers of the provincial governments.

One scheme the imperial Chinese government introduced to raise funds was to allow provincial governments to sell Imperial Academy degrees, the profits from this were collected into a fund known as the jiansheng silver fund (監銀). Under the reign of the Daoguang Emperor, provincial treasuries kept approximately 48% of the money made from this scheme in provincial grain reserves known as Changpingcang (常平倉) and provincial silver reserves known as fengzhuyin (封貯銀), the Ministry of Revenue was attempting to get their hands on a third of these reserves, factually borrowing against the predicted income of the provincial Jiansheng silver funds which was feeding these reserves. This scheme was only functional if the imperial Chinese government had status awards (which were symbolic capital) which people would actually want to purchase using real economic capital, the imperial government would have to be able to arbitrarily dictate the prices for these symbolic awards, and would also have maintained complete control over the selling process for these awards. Chinese censor Huashana (花沙納) was highly critical of the Ministry of Revenue's profit-generating plan to start selling provincial examination degrees and titles (舉人), this had in the history of China never been allowed to be sold before showcasing how desperate the Ministry of Revenue was at the time for generating money to continue fighting the expensive war. Huashana praised the idea of producing paper money as a far better alternative to selling offices and degrees, but despite his anti-office selling stance he did not advocate for it to be abolished.

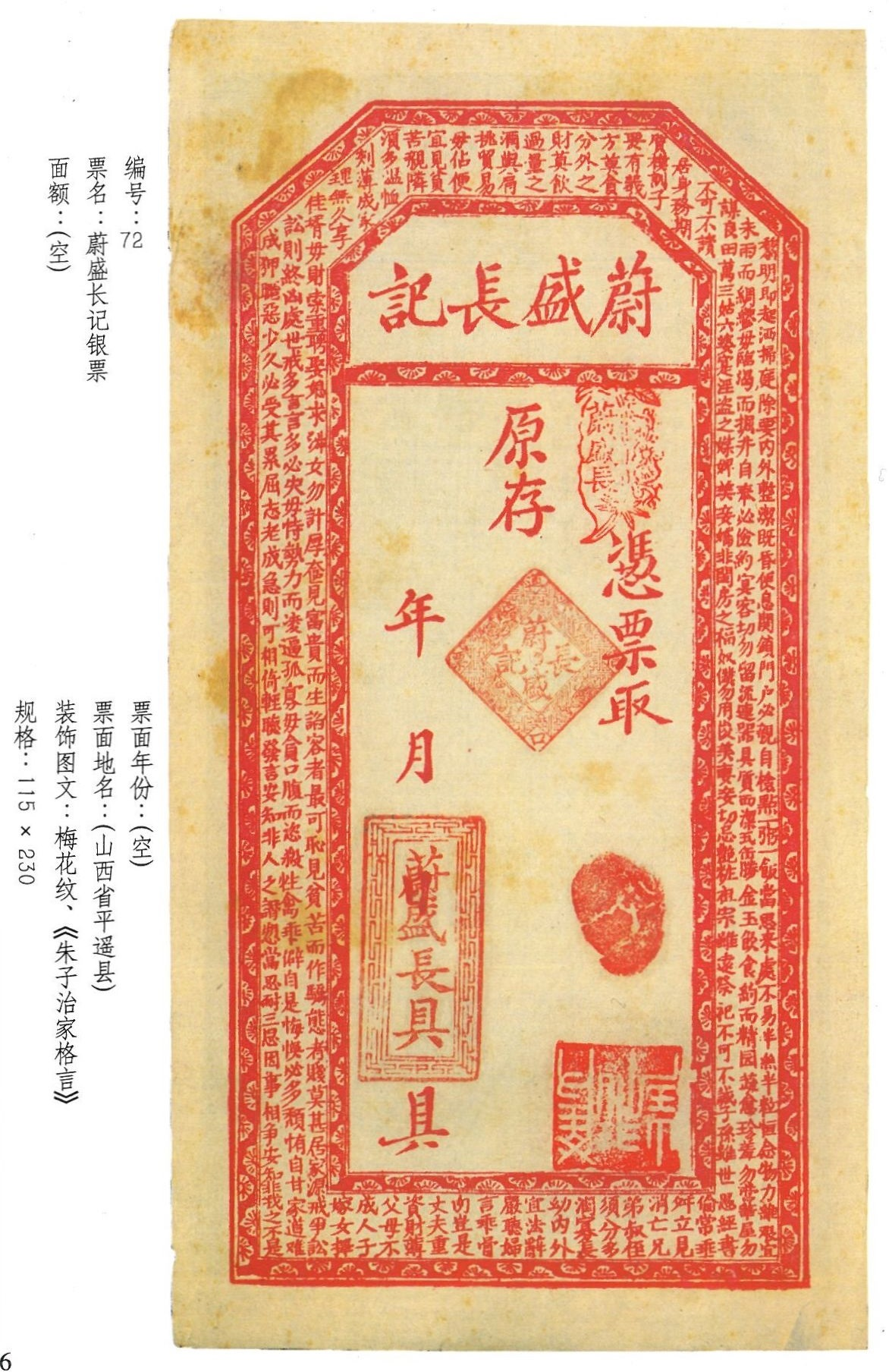
A blank form of a remittance note of the Weishengzhang Bank (蔚盛長), one of the Shanxi banks.

During the 19th century, Chinese trade in commodities such as tea, silk, and grain was of such a large volume that this trade actually taxed the capabilities of the copper-alloy cash coins-based currency system of China. During this period imperial Chinese revenues had to be remitted to the capital city of Beijing and provisional salaries paid. At the time the transportation of large sums of precious metal bullion was both expensive and risky to undertake. However, with the outbreak of the Taiping rebellion the business of transacting funds and revenue became even more dangerous. In order to overcome these new difficulties the existing Shanxi banks (票号, "draft banks" or "remittance banks", which had earned this nickname as most remittance banks were owned and operated by merchants from the province of Shanxi, meanwhile, foreigners in China called these institutions "native banks" to describe both the Shanxi banks and large money lenders whose businesses had accumulated a sufficient of capital to make loans) were greatly expanded to accommodate this demand. The principal function of the Shanxi banks under normal circumstances was that to send currency to more distant places in payment for traded goods and services. For this service the remittance banks charged a fee which ranged from 2% to 6%. During the usual course of business, these banks also held Qing Chinese government funds for disbursement. As the Shanxi banks were strongly represented in the north of China, the Chinese government saw it as only natural that these banks would be chosen to disburse the Hubu Guanpiao tael notes through their services. The Shanxi banks were often active in the assigned treaty ports cultivating the business of both Chinese merchants and foreigner traders alike. The Shanxi banks tended to be very competitive in their nature and cooperated extensively with other branches of banking corporations within their own sphere, they would often send crucial banking-related news to member banks by carrier pigeon. Prior to the introduction of the railroad to China, the Chinese economy relied heavily on Shanxi banks to finance inter-city commerce. In Northern China the preferred method of land transportation was the camel due to the fact that these animals could cope with the conditions of Northern China while many other animals could not, and the Shanxi banks employed camels in the north for transportation. The Shanxi banks and other Chinese banking companies were essential in connecting the various monetary systems that circulated in China at the time by facilitating interregional trade and commerce, providing credit for merchants, and cooperating in times of crisis. It was customary for example for the Shanghai banks to make advances to junk owners who were engaged in the trade of carrying tribute rice to the north, holding their vessels as collateral. These junks after having unloaded their rice in the port, would return with shipments of oil, peas, bean cakes, and other products for trade.

In the year 1858 a crisis occurred when the Shanghai banks would let the merchants borrow money to pay for the import of various foreign products and merchandise with the expectation that the tribute junks would return with oil and foodstuffs with a value that would be sufficient to offset the advance paid by the Shanghai banks. However, at this time the Second Opium War was being fought with the United Kingdom and France in the northern parts of China. The tribute junks were sunk on their voyage back to Shanghai. Had bullion in precious metals such as gold and silver have been demanded immediately to cover the loss that had occurred during this crisis, then the Shanghai banks would have gone bankrupt. Being allied with the Shanxi group, the local Shanghai banks were given time by the holders of the notes to obtain the necessary funds from other Chinese cities and the crisis which could have severely affected the economy of Shanghai negatively was thereby averted.

The Taiping Rebellion had caused the government of the Qing dynasty to fall into an extreme debt spiral which forced it to reconsider introducing paper money as a medium for exchange. This was advertised by the imperial government as a necessary evil because of a shortage of bronze which meant that the production of cash coinage had to be heavily scaled doen. The pauperised Chinese public was for centuries uncompromisingly minded against the idea of paper money emissions in any way, shape, or form and would not accept it for any reason. Half a century earlier in the year 1814, when Cai Zhiding (蔡之定, Ts'ai Chih-Ting), who was a high official in the Ministry of State, petitioned to the court of the Jiaqing Emperor advocating the resumption of a paper money currency, this request was denied. Cai was later severely rebuked in the Jiaqing Emperor's memorial in which he pointed out that neither the Chinese government nor any individuals in the past had experienced benefits from the circulation of a paper money. The Jiaqing Emperor was not fully without justification in asserting his stance against paper currency, as the era Ming government notes from their introduction had been inconvertible into metal currencies. With no government backing into any other forms of currency these notes were swiftly depreciated. While this may seem only logical today the Chinese had to learn this lesson the hard way.

The first radical change to the Chinese monetary system involved the authorization and introduction of "big cash coins" (大錢 - known today as multiple cash coins). This measurement was seen as one of the only remaining options left, and simultaneously the Qing government decided to reintroduce paper currency. Xianfeng's paper money consisted of two types of paper bank notes, the first of which was denominated in qian, or copper cash; and the second type, in silver taels.

After the Taiping rebels had captured Nanjing the Qing government realised how big the rebellion had become and started issuing new currencies including the Hubu Guanpiao tael notes. The decision to introduce the Hubu Guanpiao was made in a rush during the spring of 1853 due to the enormous shock of losing Nanjing. Because Nanjing fell to the Taiping Heavenly Kingdom payments of salaries in the city were referred and a debate began to rage within the Ministry of Revenue, speculations began to spread about the implementation of an imminent prohibition of convertible cash notes issued by private banks from Nanjing (錢票) and the creation of a shop tax (鋪稅). Sojourning merchants, and especially the merchant Shanxi banks, which tended to handle the empire-wide remittance business, left Nanjing. This resulted in people attacking local banks to withdraw their savings in a run on the banks resulting in many of them going bankrupt. During this time a contribution campaign was stated among local Chinese banks as well as major silk and tea merchant houses in July of the year 1853. Until the end of the year, this campaign yielded 339,000 taels of silver and more than 190,000 strings of copper-alloy cash coins. In response to the ongoing turmoil the Xianfeng Emperor issued a degree which made three promises, the first promise was that all debates about implementing merchant contributions (商捐), a merchant tax (商稅), or issuing levies per household (按戶收錢) should cease, the second point stated that middle- and low ranking officials should continue to receive their salaries, and thirdly that government paper money (鈔) should be issued, while at the same time privately produced notes would continue to be accepted.

=== Introduction and circulation ===
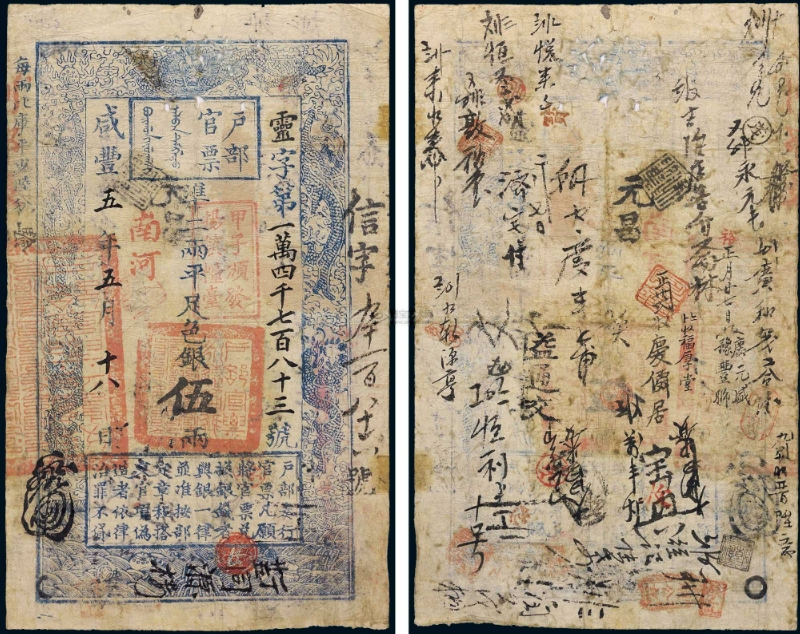
A Hubu Guanpiao (戶部官票) with a lot of endorsements, as is typical for earlier issues as this indicates that these notes were widely accepted.

The silver sycee-based Hubu Guanpiao were introduced alongside the copper-alloy cash coins-based Great Qing Treasure Note by the Chinese government during the third year of the Xianfeng era (1953) with their main difference being into what they could be converted. Because of this, they were also referred to as "Yinpiao" (銀票, "silver notes") by the Chinese people. The introduction of the Hubu Guanpiao tael notes largely followed the original proposal set forth by Huashana, the original government tael notes were issued in smaller denominations and their distribution was handled by paying 20% of the salaries of civil officials using them. While both the Hubu Guanpiao and Great Qing Treasure Note were introduced in 1853, the Hubu Guanpiao would be discontinued earlier in the year 1858 (Xianfeng 8) with some denominations being discontinued before the series ended starting in 1856 (Xianfeng 6).

The Hubu Guanpiao were originally intended to be used to pay the salaries of government officials, this was because the Ministry of Revenue reported that its actual silver stock in its vault was too low for these immediate payments. In the summer of the year 1853, the use of the Hubu Guanpiao was extended to all other government expenditures in order to replace actual silver.

The Regulations for the Trial Introduction of Guanpiao (試行官票章程) stated that the Hubu Guanpiao notes were redeemable in specie in both silver sycees or copper-alloy cash coins (or notes denominated in cash coins) at local banks. When the Hubu Guanpiao tael notes were first used to pay the salaries of government officials in the second month of the year 1853, the government of the Qing dynasty had made the promise that, after a period of six months, people could take the Hubu Guanpiao tael notes to the imperial Treasury to have them redeemed for their stated value in silver. Apparently by the eighth month of the year 1853 this promise by the government had not been kept. This did not turn out to be enforceable as official money shops in Beijing refused to pay out in silver, and merchant banks could not be forced to pay either. This effectively meant that the notes were non-redeemable. The Hubu Guanpiao were issued in the denominations of 1 tael, 3 taels, 5 taels, 10 taels, and 50 taels. (Note: They had their official exchange rate with the copper-based currencies set to 1 tael of silver sycees for 2000 cash coins in actual coinage or Great Qing Treasure Notes.) Despite their face value, the Ministry of Revenue prohibited provincial governments from paying out actual silver for the Hubu Guanpiao. Only military officers and civilian employees at military headquarters were actually allowed to exchange their tael notes for silver. The circulation of a Hubu Guanpiao bill was confined to its province of issuance and provincial governments were further prohibited from returning the notes back to Beijing as a part of the payment of their yearly tax quotas. These policies all led to a humongous confusion over what should actually be done with the Hubu Guanpiao. Provincial governments refused to follow the stipulations set by the imperial Chinese government, provinces like Jiangsu and Zhejiang paid parts of their taxes using Hubu Guanpiao notes and the province of Fujian allowed them to be redeemed in silver specie within its borders. Not all exceptions were positive for the people, while in theory, 50% of all taxes could be paid using Hubu Guanpiao tael notes, some provinces and some local magistrates accepted only 30% or would even reject payments made in Hubu Guanpiao altogether.

In the summer of 1853 the military headquarters and various provincial treasures were given 2,000,000 taels in Hubu Guanpiao notes from the Ministry of Revenue, this was a change from the failed plan by the Ministry of Revenue to borrow the silver against provincial contribution funds. The new plan was to use the silver saved by not paying out portions of the statutory salaries, this would serve as a cash reserve to back the Hubu Guanpiao. The Hubu Guanpiao notes rather than being smoothly introduced to the local markets were "dumped" (Lanfa) on purveyors of goods and services to the bureaucracy of the Qing government and were not as easily accepted back in tax payments to the government by these same purveyors. In the Qing dynasty capital city of Beijing the circulation of these notes was extensive and the government used three different channels to distribute them into the market namely the already existing Beijing Metropolitan District and the newly established provincial treasuries and the military commissary. By utilising the already existing bureaucracy of the Beijing Metropolitan district, the new notes were more easily and swiftly introduced into the Beijing market, this way all government officials in the city and private contractors operating there would receive a percentage of their pay in the Hubu Guanpiao tael notes. To distribute these notes into the provinces outside of Beijing the Ministry of Revenue would utilise the services of special banks which were specifically appointed by the government for the purpose of bringing them onto local markets. Because of the paramount importance of the "Shanxi banks" to the Chinese economy the Ministry of Revenue decided to use these banks for the purpose of handling the silver tael-based Hubu Guanpiao government notes and the transactions made using them. The third and final way the government of the Qing dynasty distributed the Hubu Guanpiao tael notes into general circulation were the various commissary departments of the Chinese military as these institutions were responsible for paying the salaries of the army and navy. As soldiers and marines were paid partially using the Hubu Guanpiao this ensured that at the places where they were stationed these notes would see greater circulation, this was especially true for the areas surrounding the Grand Canal as one of the primary military strategies employed during the war with the Taiping Heavenly Kingdom was to hold this waterway at all costs as it was extremely vital for warfare.

The Hubu Guanpiao tael notes were sent from Beijing to the other provinces of China as a method to pay for imperial government expenditures on military or construction projects. Government regulations regarding the usage of the Hubu Guanpiao tael notes stated that 80% of all government expenditures should be paid using real silver while 20% was to be paid out using the Hubu Guanpiao tael notes. This rate was later adapted to 50/50 somewhere in late 1853.

The Hubu Guanpiao tael notes saw limited circulation on the Chinese market, this was largely because of their high nominal values, which meant that they proved inconvenient for the rather daily exchanges. Furthermore, they were not backed by any actual silver which meant that they were not convertible into actual silver money.

The Great Qing Treasure Note cash notes and Hubu Guanpiao tael notes were not the only solutions the Chinese government offered to fix its financial crisis, but the actual implementation of these solutions varied greatly from province-to-province. Scholarly studies surrounding the effects around the introduction of these many new types of monies and what effect they had all played into the new monetary system, however, while the Great Qing Treasure Note cash notes and Hubu Guanpiao tael notes were not actually convertible into hard currency they had a fixed rate to each other and did circulate throughout the Machu Empire.

During the ninth month of the year 1853, official government banks were established by the Qing to exchange the Hubu Guanpiao tael notes. However, these official government banks refused to exchange these notes for any real silver. Instead, the official banks would exchange the Hubu Guanpiao tael notes, as well as Great Qing Treasure Note cash notes, for Daqian and their own notes. During the ninth month of the year 1853, a 1 tael Hubu Guanpiao note could be exchanged at these banks for 200 specimens of 10 wén Daqian. On the same day, the market exchange rate for a real silver sycee against standard copper-alloy cash coins was 1 tael of silver for 2,500 wén in Zhiqian. Additionally, at this point the Daqian had already depreciated by more than 40%.

Some officials working for the Ministry of Revenue has argued that the government should be very conservative with issuing the Hubu Guanpiao into circulation, as they claimed that the use of silver-based notes as a means of overcoming the shortage of silver due to the ongoing war with the Taiping rebels was effective as long as the note issue was limited to only 20% of all payments conducted by the government of the Qing dynasty, a notable exception was made for people like the generals and the imperial princes who traditionally received their payments entirely in silver. Critics who supported paper money in their memorials to the Qing throne stated that the Ministry of Revenue was too undecided on their monetary policies and that they came too late. Many critics demanded that government notes would be made fully convertible in specie and that they should be treated as legal tender in 100% of all government transactions and could circulate throughout the Qing Empire without the restrictions that were currently set on them by the Ministry of Revenue. Some critics suggested that the Hubu Guanpiao should be forcefully introduced to the people as tax bonds, which would be repayable by the Chinese government over a few years in the form of discounts on the land tax. Many of these officials also stated their disapproval of the circulation of private cash shop notes and that this practice must cease to prevent the general over-circulation of paper currency. At the same time there were fears that the notes which were issued by private companies would become a threat to the credit of the government issued Hubu Guanpiao tael notes, in the case that the private banks would go bankrupt. Lastly, some government officials urged that the circulation of Hubu Guanpiao should be confined only to the capital city of Beijing.

Wang Maoyin, an imperial censor who was a strong proponent of this more reserved policy in circulating paper money, he feared that the private banks would be forced to continue to make payments on the interest on the government deposits while not being able to recoup the actual silver needed for the reserves. Wang did not know that the Chinese provincial contribution funds would not stay as predictable as time went by. Wang Maoyin also criticised the plan by the Ministry of Revenue to take funds from the jiansheng silver fund (監銀) early in 1853, his largest objection was the lack of control the ministry had over the contributions which would later be necessary to refund the capital. The total emission of Hubu Guanpiao tael notes proposed by the Ministry of Revenue was 2,000,000 taels. The majority of the appropriated funds would come from bank deposits of provincial governments of which the imperial Chinese government planned to appropriate one-third to finance these emissions. At the time the bank deposits of provincial governments in China proper amounted to 6,114,000 taels of silver and 710,110 strings of standard cash coins in total (a third of this would be 1,833,000 taels of silver and 213,033 strings of standard cash coins). He was expeditiously moved to the Ministry of War for his suggestions for enforcing a more conservative note issuing policy. The criticism put forth by Wang Maoyin was notably mentioned in Karl Marx' Das Kapital.

The newly introduced Hubu Guanpiao tael notes circulated alongside preexisting local currencies as well and was traded with them from the beginning, this changed after 5 months when the imperial Chinese government decided to suspend making them convertible into real silver sycees effectively making them a fiat currency. According to Frank King the Hubu Guanpiao tael notes were still theoretically convertible into copper-alloy cash coins and Great Qing Treasure Note cash notes, this convertibility could not actually be enforced.

There is in reality very little evidence which suggests that the Hubu Guanpiao was actually used in any private transactions for business, they were even likely to have ever been used in retail transactions which were dependent on cash coins. At the end of 1853, the private banks in the city of Beijing had ceased paying out copper-alloy cash coins for the Hubu Guanpiao; the effect this had on those that had received these notes as a part of their salaries in Beijing was completely devastating. A contemporary observer of the situation at the end of the year 1853 said of it:

"Among families in Beijing who have received government notes, the wealthier ones have already paid them as contribution [i.e. bought offices], the poorer families hold the bills in their hands without a place to exchange them into copper cash, so they are forced to sell them at discount prices to treacherous dealers who have monopolized the acquisition of contributions and in this way return the bills [to the Treasury]."

- Extract from Zhou Yumin (周育民). Wan-Qing caizheng yu shehui bianqian (晚清財政與社會變遷) (Shanghai: Shanghai renmin chubanshe, 2000). p. 196.

Near the end of 1853 the Ministry of Revenue introduced the non-convertible Great Qing Treasure Note cash notes in order to meet the demand for small denomination notes in salary payments, to use at central government construction sites, and to ensure that the Hubu Guanpiao tael notes had the opportunity to be redeemed in cash notes which was pegged at fixed parity of 1 tael to 2000 wén. However, like the Great Qing Treasure Note cash notes, the actual value of the Hubu Guanpiao was severely discounted on the market. In the year Xianfeng 3 (1853) the Ministry of Revenue gave authorisation to the local provincial governments of China to directly issue notes denominated in copper-alloy cash coins and silver taels, these notes bore its official seal and were valid throughout the empire.

=== Inflation and depreciation ===
Rather than showing restraint the government of the Qing dynasty had ordered larger denomination notes to be produced to match their towering expenditures. Both Great Qing Treasure Note cash notes and Hubu Guanpiao tael notes were increasing forced upon the provinces of China proper in growing numbers until the point that they were circulating in most of the provinces of this region.

Some people were actually willing to purchase Hubu Guanpiao tael notes (at a discount), and they would later use them as part of their payment of taxes or for other things like title purchases. However, the difficulty of paying taxes with the Hubu Guanpiao tael notes would further undermine their credibility on the market. This made sure that they depreciated quickly in the exchange market: by the end of the year 1856 a 1 tael Hubu Guanpiao note could be exchanged only for an amount between 800 and 900 wén in Zhiqian, this meant that they had suffered a depreciation of more than 60% on the market. Furthermore, in the year 1859 Hubu Guanpiao tael notes depreciated to only 5% of their nominal value.

As the amount of inflation affecting the bills increased, more pressure was placed to help enforce the Ministry of Revenue's stringent policies. If after an investigation irregularities were discovered, then the government would issue a punitive action as the result. After corruption among the note issuing banks was discovered by Sushun, who was the president of the Ministry of Revenue in the year 1859, 100 arrests of corrupt notables and wealthy merchants were made. That year a fire at the offices of Ministry of Revenue offices destroyed most of the records. As it was suspected that corrupt officials complicit, the government arrested more people. There were measures taken and police actions were made to enforce the new currency laws that were more in the Manchu military tradition than that of the Chinese civil authorities of the Qing dynasty. However these enforcements which were done when the Chinese public refused to accept the notes happened without correcting the root cause of the problems and prove to only hasten the weakening and eventual abolition of the Great Qing Treasure Note and Hubu Guanpiao note series.

Government notes and other currencies would continue to lose their market value to the point that the government itself started to refuse accepting Hubu Guanpiao tael notes as a form of tax payment for the land tax and grain tribute payments, although the Hubu Guanpiao were still accepted in customs and salt taxes as well as a form of payment for office selling and they continued to be issued as part of government salaries and stipends in the city if Beijing. This policy resulted in the Hubu Guanpiao tael notes being depreciated more rapidly ultimately leading to their abolition.

In the year 1856 the Great Qing Treasure Note cash notes had replaced the Hubu Guanpiao in land tax payments, this was done in order to avoid exchange rate losses for poorer peasants as generally their tax obligations were often calculated to only be fractions of taels making the Hubu Guanpiao disadvantageous for them to use. The Hubu Guanpiao would remain a form of legal tender for the payment of salt taxes, tea taxes, and customs as these taxes usually involved larger sums of money, but the domain of the tael notes would be severely limited by this step. The practice of office selling was still mostly done using Hubu Guanpiao tael notes and to purchase offices using them remained very secure, this made office selling contributions the most reliable way to withdraw the Hubu Guanpiao by the government after they came into circulation via salaries. The Hubu Guanpiao notes tended to be heavily discounted in exchange due to their inability to be redeemed and would eventually be entirely repudiated by the Chinese government. At their inglorious end, the Hubu Guanpiao notes became completely worthless and disappeared completely from the market by the year 1863.

Up until the year Xianfeng 4 (1854) many endorsements were made on the reverse side of Hubu Guanpiao tael notes confirming the fact that they were still generally accepted by the Chinese public as a form of payment. However, by the year Xianfeng 5 (1855) it appeared as if the Chinese people had turned against them as a valid bill of exchange due to inflation as notes produced after this period had fewer and fewer endorsements, by the year Xianfeng 9 (1859) people would refuse to accept these tael notes altogether. By the spring of the year 1859 their value had fallen to only 5% of their face value. At the end of their official circulation period, the leftover Hubu Guanpiao notes were being traded on the streets of Beijing at a 99% loss compared to their face value.

Prior to the year Xianfeng 7 (1857) Hubu Guanpiao notes were rarely used in the purchases of offices, however, by the year of Xianfeng 10 (1860) silver prices have become relatively low and the main use of Hubu Guanpiao tael notes was as debentures for unpaid salaries, recipients of these salary debentures, whether they were (theoretically) redeemable Hubu Guanpiao tael notes or so-called Xiangpiao (餉票, "pay bills"), mainly sold their claims to a salary in silver to office purchasers who used these bills to buy offices. There is no evidence that these Xiangpiao bills were actually circulated in the economy neither is there any evidence that they were redeemed for salaries. So by this time tael notes were used more commonly used to purchase office titles through the Qing government's office selling scheme. Like the Hubu Guanpiao, the Xiangpiao were used until the year 1868, when an edict issued by the imperial government outlawed all government notes. As in the capital city of Beijing the use of these notes led to a depreciation of office prices, but conversely, they partially alleviated the social fallout that occurred from unpaid military salaries.

Before their value had dropped as significantly as it did, the Ministry of Revenue had already given the orders to cease the production and distribution of the Hubu Guanpiao in the year Xianfeng 7 (1857). During the final year that the Hubu Guanpiao notes were issued, the Chinese government produced 60,2000,000 silver taels in paper money onto the market. During this same period, the total tax revenue collected by the imperial Chinese government amounted to only 86,600,000 taels in silver. After the Tongzhi Emperor ascended to the throne of the Qing dynasty, this monetary policy was ended. A total of 9,780,000 taels in Hubu Guanpiao notes had been printed by the time that they had been officially deprecated. After this point, all further emissions of official Chinese paper money were the Great Qing Treasure Note denominated in copper-alloy cash coins as the tael notes started slowly disappearing from the market.

In a 1962 study Yang Duanliu cited memorials which were written to the Xianfeng Emperor which attempted to show him that his order to the provinces to keep fifty percent of their reserves in silver was ignored by provincial authorities and that the actual ratio of reserves varied substantially across different provinces. Meanwhile, some Chinese provinces did not keep any silver reserves at all, while the province of Henan (a province very close to the capital city of Beijing) did not even accept the Hubu Guanpiao notes they themselves issued as a form of payment for provincial taxes. Yang claims that these inadequate reserve ratios and local insubordination to imperial government laws and edicts were to blame why by the year Qixiang 1 (1862) government notes had completely disappeared from circulation. Jerome Ch'ên meanwhile suggested that the Ministry of Revenue made the rampant inflation a lot worse by insisting that no more than half of individual tax remittance could be made with either Great Qing Treasure Note cash notes or Hubu Guanpiao tael notes with the remainder of the taxes being demanded in either cash coins or silver.

Niv Horesh suggests that the reason the Qing dynasty suffered from hyperinflation during the reign of the Xianfeng Emperor was not only because the notes issued by the government at the time were inadequately backed up by hard currency, but that the Xianfeng Emperor approved the issuance of heavily debased and ill-fated Daqian. Horesh blamed the 9,200,000 taels in war indemnities imposed on the Qing by foreign powers following the Opium Wars that were demanded from the Qing in March of the year 1850 as a strong motivation for the Xianfeng regime to start debasing its currency despite the fact that high denomination low intrinsic value cash coins has had a tainted reputation throughout Chinese history. In December 1850, a much larger threat to the rule of the Qing appeared in the form of a major civil war during the Taiping Rebellion meaning that the issuing of Daqian and paper currency were seen as a last ditch emergency measure which the government had to undertake for its continued rule. According to Ch'ên many of the court officials that voiced their support for using notes were also in favour of issuing the Daqian and even iron cash coins as a means to alleviate the fiscal crisis as well as the general shortage of copper cash coins that were caused by the Taiping rebels expanding through Southeast China.

Both the Great Qing Treasure Note cash notes and Hubu Guanpiao tael notes continued to be accepted in the practice of office selling and would continue to circulate in the provinces of China proper as non-interest bearing debentures until the years 1867–1868, when all government-issued notes were officially declared invalid.

=== Aftermath ===
There was a gradual return to the bimetallic traditional currency system and by the year 1861 all new currencies of the Xianfeng era were given up, with the notable exception being the 10 wén Daqian which continued to be produced until the abolition of cash coins themselves.

According to a memorial issued by the Ministry of Revenue, the total amount of Hubu Guanpiao tael notes issued during the years 1853 until 1860 was 9,781,200 taels. This number is not particularly high, and a large share of the Hubu Guanpiao tael notes was used outside of the city of Beijing. The Qing Treasury Records bookkeeping from this period also did not distinguish the notes denominated in taels of silver from real silver. In the Qing Treasury Records all transactions that use "taels" as the unit of account were always recorded as "silver taels" without distinguishing or not whether these "silver taels" were real silver or Hubu Guanpiao tael notes, so the actual annual figure of Hubu Guanpiao tael notes that were pumped into the Beijing market through the expenditures of the imperial government remain unknown.

After the abolition of the Great Qing Treasure Note and the Hubu Guanpiao notes the government of the Qing dynasty did not produce any notes anymore for decades. The final phase of Qing government note issuance lasted from 1897 right until the Xinhai Revolution ousted the monarchy in 1912. These later issues were substantively different from the earlier two issues because, by then, notes had been imported from Western printers. These new notes were often horizontal-shaped in design which were novel in Chinese terms. Because of their horizontal designs and better security issues harder to forge by Chinese counterfeiters. The majority of these new notes were disbursed by semiofficial modern Chinese banks based on the models presented by Western and Japanese banks in China.

The Ministry of Revenue established a central bank, the Da-Qing Bank, in 1905. This bank would issue the last government notes of the Qing dynasty until it was overthrown.

== List of government notes denominated in silver taels issued during the Xianfeng era ==
List of notes denominated in silver tael sycees issued during the Xianfeng era:

Xianfeng tael notes (1853–1858)
Denomination	Years of production	Approximate size (in millimeters)	Image
1 liǎng	Xianfeng 3, Xianfeng 4, Xianfeng 5, Xianfeng 6	151 x 250	
3 liǎng	Xianfeng 3, Xianfeng 4, Xianfeng 5, Xianfeng 6, Xianfeng 7, Xianfeng 8	152 x 248	
5 liǎng	Xianfeng 3, Xianfeng 4, Xianfeng 5, Xianfeng 6, Xianfeng 7	154 x 250	
10 liǎng	Xianfeng 3, Xianfeng 4, Xianfeng 5, Xianfeng 6	190 x 315	
50 liǎng	Xianfeng 3, Xianfeng 4, Xianfeng 5, Xianfeng 6	190 x 310	

== Design, security features, and design elements ==
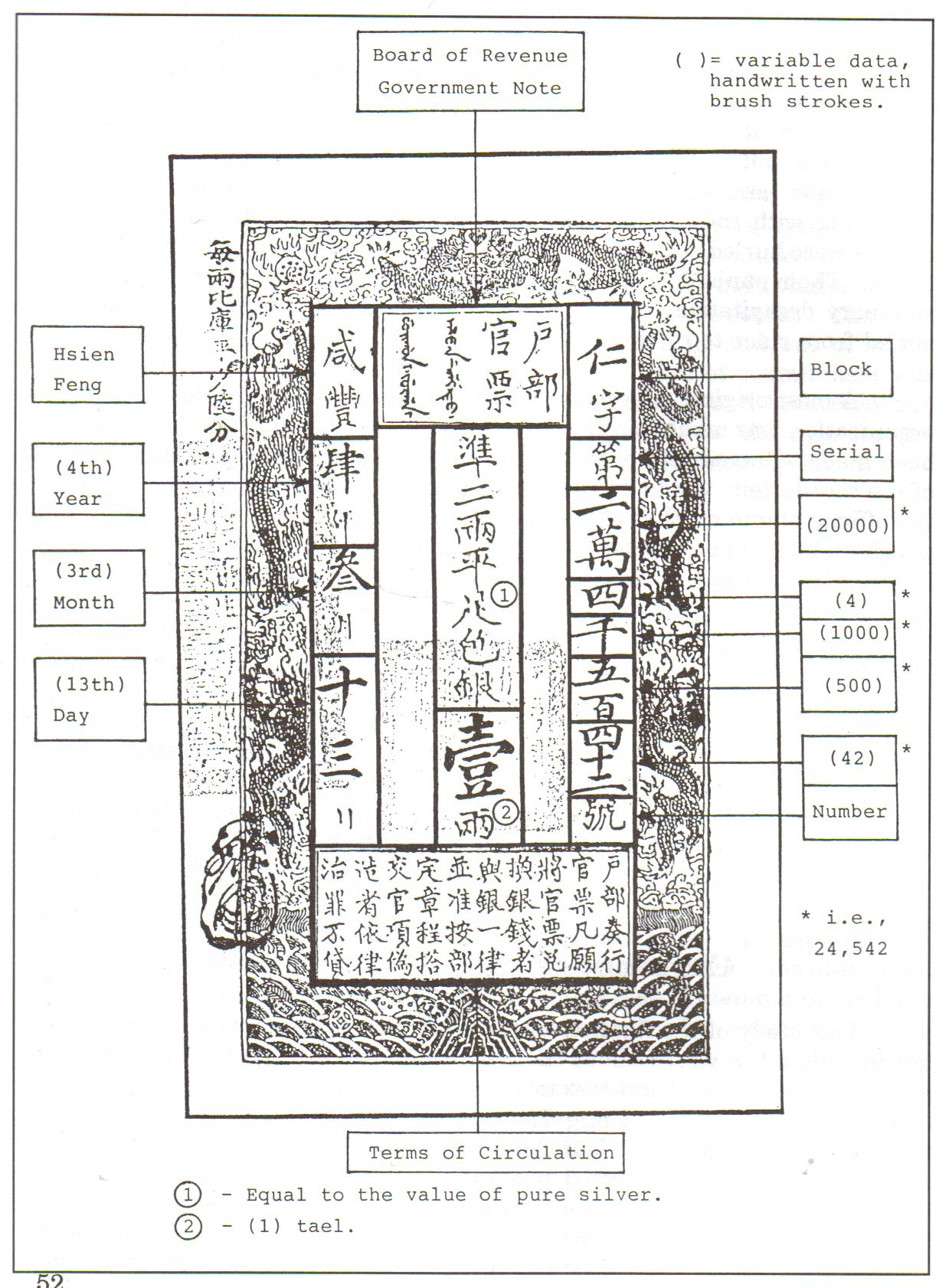
A layout of Hubu Guanpiao government notes.

The Hubu Guanpiao tael notes were block printed in dark blue ink on handmade paper and the Chinese characters on them were written vertically and its appearance was similar to that of all ancient Chinese paper money that came before it. The official seals (or "chops") on them were vermilion in colour and the dates and serial numbers on them were handwritten in black ink by the issuing parties. Like the Great Qing Treasure Note the date appeared on the left side of the note and was written vertically within a column, unlike the Great Qing Treasure Note the Hubu Guanpiao did not only contain the reign year (or "era date") such as "Xianfeng 5", but also specified on which day and month the note was issued.

The nominal value (or denomination) of the note represented in taels of pure silver appeared in the middle of the note, while its block and serial number were placed on the right side. The frame of the note had five five-fingered (or imperial) Chinese dragons, on the bottom of the note was a mountain made from precious stones surrounded by waves of water and branches of coral. At the top of the note were the Chinese characters for "Ministry of Revenue Government Note" or "Hubu Guanpiao" (票官部戶) written vertically from right to left.

At the bottom of every Hubu Guanpiao was a box containing a text which stated:

"This official note is authorised by the Ministry of Revenue of the Great Qing Empire. The nominal value of this note is equal in exchange to the silver tael. It is permissible to pay official government taxes with this note. Counterfeiters will be severely punished to the full extent of the law"

戶部奏行
官票凡願
將官票兌
換銀錢者
與銀一律
並准按部
定章程搭
交官項偽
造者依律
治罪不貸 hù bù zòu xíng
guān piào fán yuàn
jiàng guān piào duì
huàn yínqián zhě
yǔ yín yīlǜ
bìng zhǔn àn bù
dìng zhāngchéng dā
jiāo guān xiàng wěi
zào zhě yī lǜ
zhìzuì bù dài

It is notable that the Hubu Guanpiao contained a warning to currency counterfeiters while the Great Qing Treasure Note did not, the earliest Chinese paper currencies such as the flying cash from the Tang dynasty and the Jiaozi, Huizi, and Guanzi all contained these warnings. American numismatist John E. Sandrock speculates that the Xianfeng Emperor thought that it was unnecessary to issue a warning on the Great Qing Treasure Note as they were of comparatively minor value, while those who would make counterfeit Hubu Guanpiao notes would be executed through decapitation. Foreigners residing in Shanghai in the year 1857 reported that the Chinese government commonly decapitated currency counterfeiters, which would indicate that the practice was a common occurrence.

The Hubu Guanpiao series were generally richer in ornamentation than the Great Qing Treasure Note cash notes. Buddhist symbols decorated the Hubu Guanpiao, these symbols include the lotus flower representing Gautama Buddha, the endless knot representing the Buddha's temporal power, the canopy of the universe, two wheels and a bamboo rattle, and many seeded pomegranates which represented fertility. While the flaming pearl representing divine knowledge and truth was present on the Great Qing Treasure Note series it was not featured on the Hubu Guanpiao.

Hubu Guanpiao notes from the province of Zhili typically carry vermilion two-character red overprint at the top left centre to indicate their point of origin.

Hubu Guanpiao tael notes were printed by having a sheet of paper that was bigger than the note itself was pressed against the block to receive the impression. This large paper sheet would contain both the note and a tally, the tally was the portion of the note that remained with the Ministry of Revenue that was used to facilitate redemption. After the note had been printed, the various officials in charge of issuance would place their seals in a way so that they would overlap with the counterfoil on the right. Thus, parts of the seal impressions remained on the tally. After this was done the block series and serial number were then duplicated on the tally for identification and redemption purposes for when the note would later be redeemed, this way officials could compare the serial numbers on both the circulating note and the tally kept by the Chinese government to see if it was a genuine specimen by checking their alignment.

=== Serial numbers ===
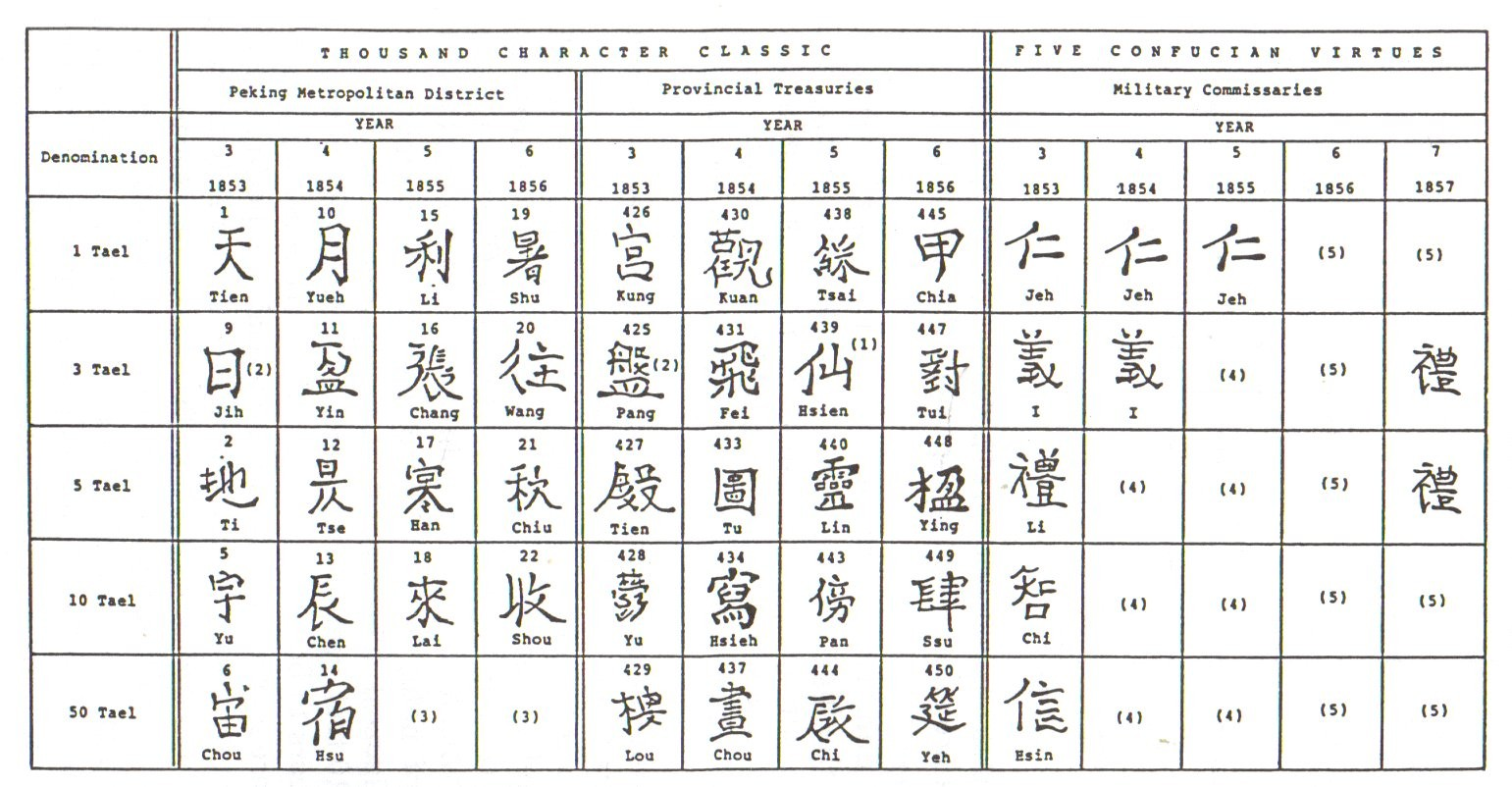
The numbering systems based on the Thousand Character Classic and the Five Confucian Virtues, respectively.

As the government had created a plurality of issuing offices across China a system was created in order to keep track of which Chinese government agency issued any particular note. This was seen as necessary as it would be able to be used to tell which notes were genuine and which ones were fraudulent when they would be presented to the government to be paid out in taels of silver sycees. The area in which the Hubu Guanpiao series of notes actually circulated at any given point in time was mostly determined by the fortunes of war and the leftover areas still held by the imperial Qing forces at the time. As more territory formerly held by the Taiping Heavenly Kingdom was retaken after 1853 the government of the Qing dynasty was quick to release Great Qing Treasure Note and Hubu Guanpiao notes into these retaken areas for local circulation.

Both the Great Qing Treasure Note cash notes and Hubu Guanpiao tael notes employed a device which used a series index, or prefix ideogram. This index of characters was based upon an early classical Chinese literary work known as the Thousand Character Classic (千字文, Qiānzì Wén). The Chinese character used as a prefix that would appear in the series block which preceded the serial number on each Hubu Guanpiao tael note was one of these thousand ideograms. Additionally, early emissions of the Hubu Guanpiao teal notes which were issued through the military commissaries used a different system that was based upon the Five Confucian Virtues (五常, wǔcháng) rather than the thousand character classic.

Generally speaking more characters from the Thousand Character Classic were used for the Great Qing Treasure Note series than for the Hubu Guanpiao. The Thousand Character Classic was already employed for both the capital city and the provincial markets, while the military offices would use the Five Confucian Virtues. The Five Confucian Virtues system is a bit more straightforward than the system based on the Thousand Character Classic. In this system, only a total of 5 Chinese characters were used and they were employed without regard to the year of their issuance. These five Chinese characters each represented one of the Confucian virtues, these virtues were benevolence (仁, rén), righteousness or justice (義, yì), proper rite or decorum (禮, lǐ), knowledge or wisdom (智, zhì), and integrity (信, xìn). "Rén" was assigned to all notes with the denomination of 1 tael, "Yì" to the 3 tael, "Lǐ" to the 5 tael, Etc.

John E. Sandrock stated that he has not seen the Five Confucian Virtues prefix system used after the year Xianfeng 5 (1855), which lead him to speculate that either this system was abandoned or that the Chinese government stopped using the military to bring these notes into circulation, Sandrock also stated that it was possible that the military issuing offices also started employing the Thousand Character Classic at this time.

The Beijing Metropolitan District and the provincial treasuries both utilised the characters from the Thousand Year Classic to identify their note issues. This numbering system allowed people to ascertain from which source region any particular Hubu Guanpiao note came by knowing which Chinese character prefixes were assigned to each of these areas. In this series characters chosen among the first 20-odd characters in the Thousand Year Classic were used to represent the city of Beijing. Meanwhile, Chinese characters chosen from among character numbers 425 to 450 represented the issues from the provinces of China proper. A major difference between the Thousand Character Classic and the Five Confucian Virtues system is that while the Five Confucian Virtues system only identified the denomination the Chinese character from the Thousand Year Classic also identified the year of issue. Because of how this system works each denomination of the Hubu Guanpiao series of tael notes issued either by the Beijing Metropolitan District or by one of the Chinese provinces can have 1 of 4 different characters assigned to it which was dependent on whether it was issued in year Xianfeng 3 (1853), Xianfeng 4 (1854), Xianfeng 5 (1855), or Xianfeng 6 (1856). An example would be a note bearing block prefix "Lin", which was the 440th character in the Thousand Year Classic, would always represent a note with the denomination of 5 taels that was issued by one of the provinces in the year Xianfeng 5.

Hong Kong-based numismatist Sup Loy developed a table to organise these numbering systems.

The final Hubu Guanpiao tael notes were issued in the year Xianfeng 7 (1857) and appear to rather be an afterthought than an official issue as these are only released in the denominations of 3 tael and 5 tael. Furthermore, they do not fit either serial numbering scheme, neither using the Thousand Character Classic or the Five Confucian Virtues, but instead using an entirely different character system altogether for the block prefix. It is unlikely that these notes saw much circulation as by this time the general Chinese populace had stopped accepting them. American numismatist John E. Sandrock claimed that when observing the quantities of Great Qing Treasure Note cash notes and Hubu Guanpiao tael notes containing the serial numbers 733, 734, and 735 that these had no endorsements whatsoever. These notes are termed as "remainders" by Sandrock as they were never placed into general circulation.

After the year Xianfeng 4 the imperial Chinese Ministry of Revenue had attempted to re-number previously issued Great Qing Treasure Note cash notes and Hubu Guanpiao tael notes for a to date unknown reason, the new serial numbers were placed in black ink using character prefixes which are not from the Thousand Year Classic at the bottom left corner of the note. It remains a mystery why certain notes were renumbered late during the Taiping Rebellion. These re-issued notes are notably listed separately in the Standard Catalog of World Paper Money.

== Seals, overprints, and endorsements ==
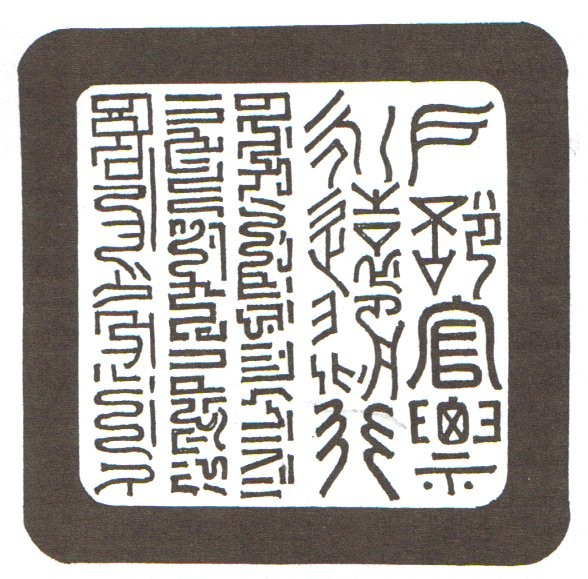
The seal of the Ministry of Revenue seal found at the centre of all Hubu Guanpiao (戶部官票) tael notes.

The seals (or "chops") used on the Hubu Guanpiao tael notes differed from those present on the Great Qing Treasure Note cash notes, the main seal placed by the Ministry of Revenue was red in colour and contained the text "Ministry of Revenue Government Note" in both Mandarin Chinese and Manchu, this seal was found on every note in the Hubu Guanpiao series. Another seal present on every specimen in this series was that of the "Ministry of Revenue Issuing Department", the name of this department is somewhat confusing, as it did not actually place any notes into circulation. There were 3 other agencies actually designed for the issuing of these notes into circulation the government of the Beijing Metropolitan District, provincial treasuries, and the various military commissaries. These agencies would all affix their own seal, these seals were either shaped like a square or a rectangle and were found on both the obverse and reverse sides of the tael notes, the presence of these seals meant that the note had entered circulation through one of these agencies.

It was also common for orange provincial overprints to br placed on Hubu Guanpiao tael notes, the name of the province was written vertically using two Chinese characters, with the exceptions of overprints from Manchuria which had three characters (三東省). American numismatist John E. Sandrock has stated to have seen Zhili, Henan, Anhui, Fengtian, Taiwan, and Manchuria.

Another commonly applied form of overprint on the tael notes are the military overprints. They appear in colours orange, vermilion, or maroon and are shaped like vertical or horizontal columns of Chinese characters, or at times take the shape of four Chinese characters surrounded by a box, military overprints were exclusively placed on the obverse (or front) side of the note.

An example of a military overprint from the province of Gansu reads: "This note is for exclusively circulation in Gansu province. This note may be used by merchants or civilians for payment of official taxes or to pay other market transactions".

Some Hubu Guanpiao government notes were re-issued using hand-stamped overprints, the overprint of this kind most commonly found is red in colour and rectangular in shape with an 8 character inscription which would read something like "Reissued in the 10th month of the year Xianfeng 6" (i.e., October 1856)., this overstamp was used on notes with the denominations of 10 taels and 50 taels.

== See also ==
- Silver certificate

== Sources ==
- Dai Zhiqiang (戴志強), ed. (2008). Zhongguo qianbi shoucang jianshang quanji (中國錢幣收藏鑒賞全集) (Changchun: Jilin chuban jituan). (in Mandarin Chinese).
- King, Frank H.H. (1965). Money and Monetary Policy in China, 1845–1895. Cambridge, Massachusetts: Harvard University Press.
- Meng Peingxing (孟彭興) (1998). "Cong feiqian dao jiaozi huizi (從"飛錢"到"交子"、"會子"), in Zhang Dainian (張岱年), ed. Zhongguo wenshi baike (中國文史百科) (Hangzhou: Zhejiang renmin chubanshe), Vol. 1, 414. (in Mandarin Chinese).
- Peng Xinwei (彭信威) (1954 [2007]). Zhongguo huobi shi (中國貨幣史) (Shanghai: Qunlian chubanshe), 580-581, 597-605. (in Mandarin Chinese).
- Xie Tianyu 謝天宇, ed. (2005). Zhongguo qianbi shoucang yu jianshang quanshu (中國錢幣收藏與鑒賞全書) (Tianjin: Tianjin guji chubanshe), Vol. 2, 508. (in Mandarin Chinese).
- Zhou Fazeng (周發增), Chen Longtao (陳隆濤), Qi Jixiang (齊吉祥), ed. (1998). Zhongguo gudai zhengzhi zhidu shi cidian (中國古代政治制度史辭典) (Beijing: Shoudu shifan daxue chubanshe), Pages 372, 375, 380, 381, 382. (in Mandarin Chinese).
