= Niv Horesh =

Niv Horesh (Hebrew: ניב חורש, Chinese: 荷尼夫; born 1971) is a researcher formerly at Western Sydney University, Australia. He was also visiting professor in China Studies at the School of Government and International Affairs at Durham University, United Kingdom.

Horesh's research incorporates four main strands in the following order: Chinese History, World Monetary History, PRC Political Economy, and PRC Foreign Policy with emphasis on the Middle East. He has authored or co-authored 9 books, and edited or co-edited 3 books, as well as publishing many journal articles.

His most important study in the first and second strands is Chinese Money in Global Context: Historic Junctures Between 600 BCE and 2012 (Stanford University Press, 2014). The book is available in Chinese translation. Subsequently, Horesh was invited to write the general entry for "Money" in Information: A Historical Companion (Princeton University Press, 2021).

The most important study in the third strand is East Asian Challenge to Western Neoliberalism: Critical Perspectives on the ‘China Model’ (Routledge, 2017), co-authored with geographer Kean Fan Lim. Within this strand too, the study of influential CPC Politburo Standing Committee Member Wang Huning (with Ruike Xu) was the first of its kind to be published in English.

Besides his academic work, Horesh was also a frequent commentator on current affairs in newspapers such as the South China Morning Post and Haaretz.

== Published works ==
His first book, Shanghai's Bund and Beyond (Yale UP, 2008), is the first comparative study of foreign banking in prewar China. The book surveys the impact of British overseas bank notes on China's economy before the outbreak of the Second Sino-Japanese War in 1937. Focusing on the two leading British banks in the region (Hongkong and Shanghai Banking Corporation and Chartered Bank of India, Australia and China), it assesses the favourable and unfavourable effects of the British presence in China, with particular emphasis on Shanghai, and traces instructive links between the changing political climate and banknote circulation volumes. Drawing on recently declassified archival materials, Niv Horesh revises previous assumptions about China's prewar economy, including the extent of foreign banknote circulation and the economic significance of the May Thirtieth Movement of 1925.

Horesh's second book Chinese Money in Global Context (Stanford UP 2013, Economics and Finance Series) makes for a China-centered examination of the evolution of money and finance around the world since the birth of coinage in Lydia (in what is today western Turkey) and up to the present. It also situates current efforts at RMB internationalisation within the broad sweep of the post-Bretton Woods world order.

His third book is Shanghai, Past and Present. It is an introduction to the warp and weft of the city's history written with non-specialists in mind.

His fourth book is Superpower China ? Historicizing Beijing's New Narratives of Leadership and East Asia's Response Thereto. Horesh is lead author here with Dr Kim and Dr Mauch as co-authors. Superpower China ? features at length analyses of contemporary IR debates in Chinese, Japanese and Korean.
