= Lin Man-houng =

Taiwanese historian

- 林滿紅
- Born: 12 February 1951 (age 75); Changhua County, Taiwan
- Education: National Taiwan University (BA, MA); Harvard University (PhD)
- Occupation: Historian

Lin Man-houng (Chinese: 林滿紅; pinyin: Lín Mǎnhóng) is a Taiwanese historian and the first female president of Academia Historica. She is also one of few female historians to boldly argue in public about Taiwan's sovereignty and international status.

== Biography ==
Lin was born in Changhua, Taiwan, in 1951, and was raised in Wufeng, Taichung. After graduating from Taichung Girls' Senior High School, she earned her B.A. and M.A. from National Taiwan University and earned her Ph.D. in history and East Asian languages from Harvard University in 1989.

Lin has been a senior research fellow at the Institute of Modern History, Academia Sinica since 1990 and professor at the Department of History, National Taiwan Normal University since 1991. From 20 May 2008 to 15 December 2010, she served as the president of the Academia Historica, the central academy of history of the Republic of China (Taiwan). Her appointment marked the first time a woman had headed the institute since its founding in 1947.

She resigned because of the institute's hosting of a controversial online poll, which listed Mao Zedong and Deng Xiaoping among the candidates for the Top 100 most influential figures in the Republic of China's hundred-year history.

Lin’s research primarily focuses on treaty ports and modern China, opium in late Qing China, currency crisis in early nineteenth-century China, and various empires and the role of Taiwanese merchants in East Asian overseas economic networks.

She has published five books and some 70 papers in Chinese, English, Japanese and Korean. Her book China Upside Down links China’s topsy-turvy change from the center of the East Asian order to its modern tragedy with the Latin American Independence Movement.
