= Paper money of the Qing dynasty =

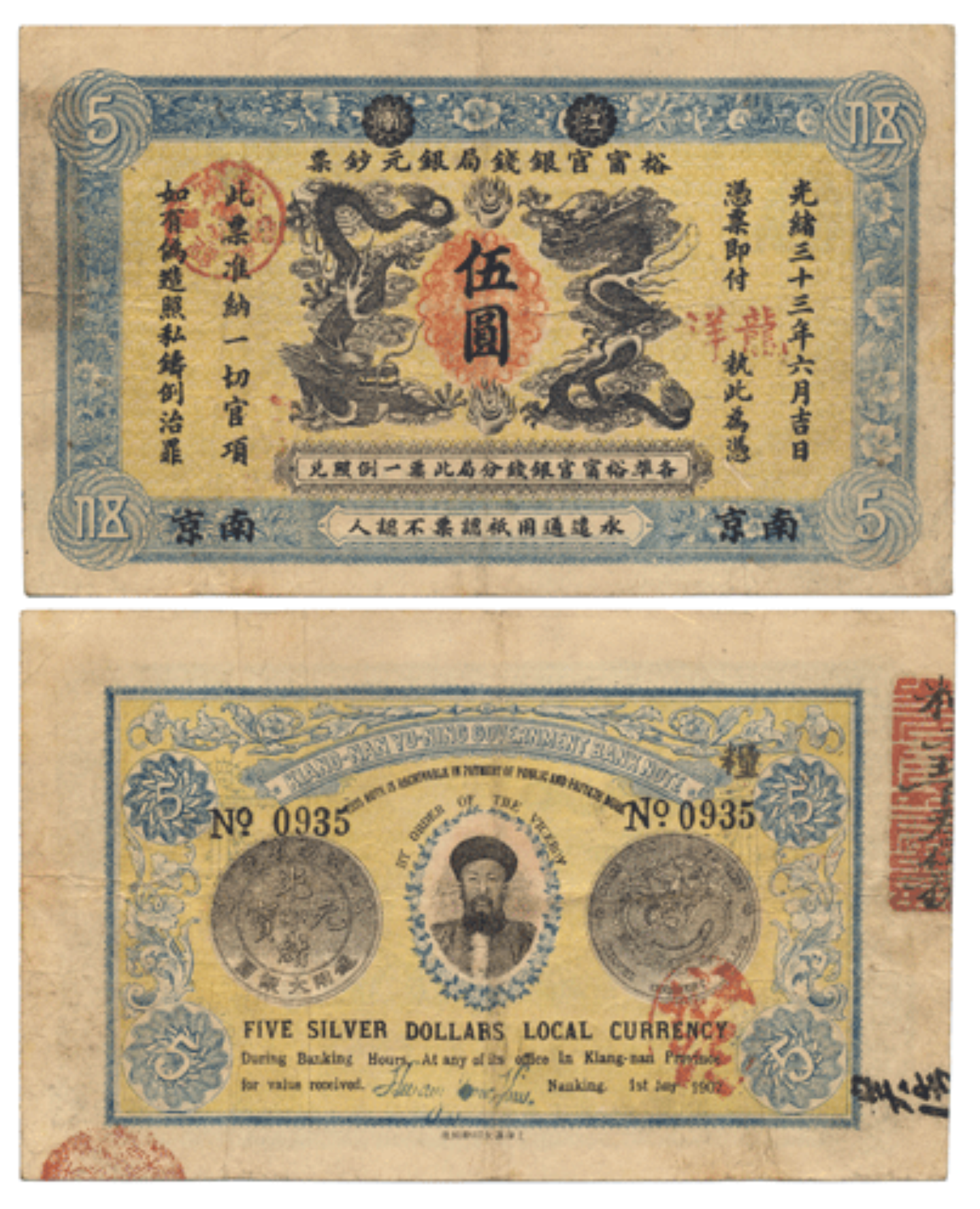
A banknote of 5 Dragon dollars issued in 1907 by the Kiangnan Yu-Ning Government Bank for circulation in the Jiangnan region.

The paper money of the Qing dynasty (Traditional Chinese: 清朝鈔票) was periodically used alongside a bimetallic coinage system of copper-alloy cash coins and silver sycees; paper money was used during different periods of Chinese history under the Qing dynasty, having acquired experiences from the prior Song, Jin, Yuan, and Ming dynasties which adopted paper money but where uncontrolled printing led to hyperinflation. During the youngest days of the Qing dynasty paper money was used but this was quickly abolished as the government sought not to repeat history for a fourth time; however, under the reign of the Xianfeng Emperor, due to several large wars and rebellions (most notably the Taiping Rebellion), the Qing government was forced to issue paper money again.

The reason why the government was forced to reform the imperial monetary system with a very complex system during the Taiping Rebellion was because the rebels had blocked the access of mint metals from the southwest of China, but more money was still needed to fight the ongoing insurgency. The advisors of the Xianfeng Emperor not only introduced copper-alloy cash coins with higher denominations than one, as well as introducing new cash coins made of metals other than brass, but also revived paper money in the shape of the Xianfeng baochao (咸豐寶鈔). Quite important for the war effort is the fact that the imperial Qing government earned some revenue by issuing these new types of currencies.

During the latter half of the 19th century various foreign banking corporations and credit institutes started doing business in China. The paper notes issued by these companies started circulating in China leading to many local companies imitating their designs and even outsourcing the production of paper money. The strong influence of these foreign banks had a modernising effect on both the economy and the currency of the Qing dynasty, leading to the imperial government issuing their own versions of modern paper money. The denominations on the paper money were as chaotic as that of the coinage types and the different exchange rates used regionally were also applied locally, while banknotes denominated in copper-alloy currency had a different value than banknotes denominated in silver currency. Concurrently banknotes issued by different branches or different banks were also discounted with paper bills issued by more reliable banks being both valued more and in higher demand than those issued by institutions with a less favourable reputation.

In the early 20th century the government of the Qing dynasty attempted to decimalise the currency among many other economic reforms and established a central bank to oversee the production of paper money; however, the chaotic monetary situation continued to plague interregional trade and would later be inherited by the Republic of China.

== History ==
=== Hubu guanpiao and other early Qing paper money ===
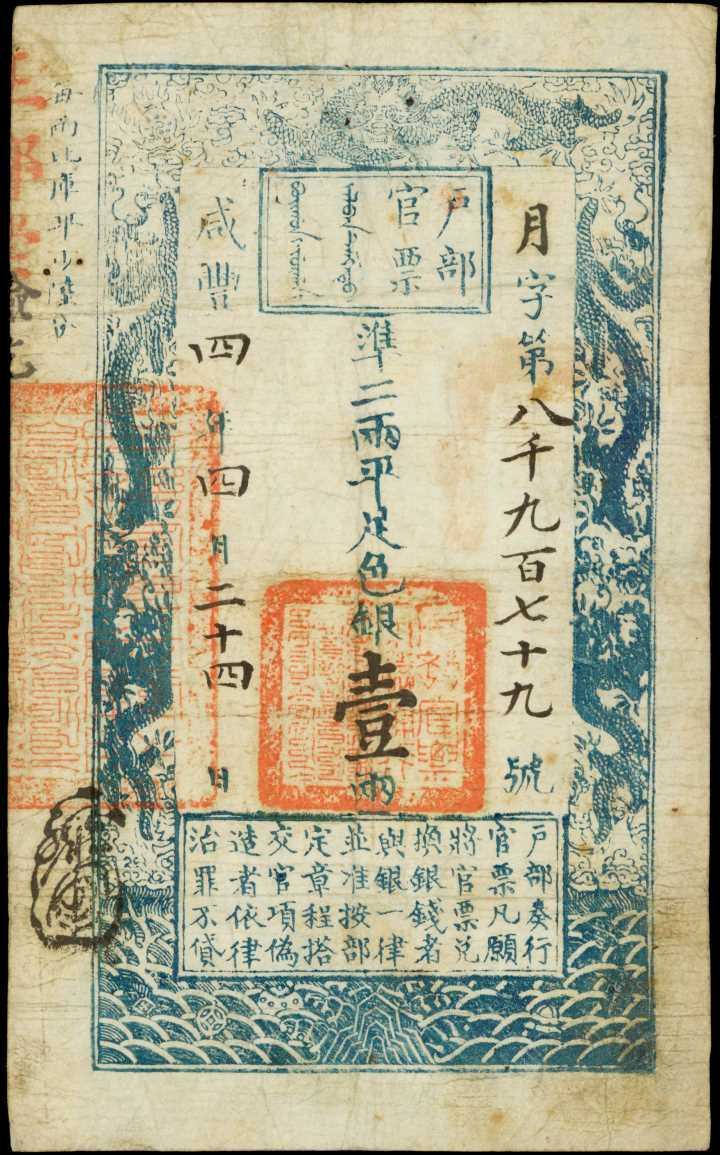
A later made Great Qing Hubu Guanpiao (大清戶部官票, dà qīng hù bù guān piào) of 1 tael (壹兩).

During the transition from Ming to Qing, the Manchu government issued banknotes known as Hubu guanpiao (戶部官票) or Shunzhi guanpiao (順治官票). They were first issued in the year 1651 on initiative of the Minister of Revenue, Wei Xiangshu (魏象樞) during the war with the remnants of the Ming dynasty to cover the more immediate expenses of the Manchus; as the finances of the Qing during this period were in dire distress, these banknotes were declared void only a decade after their issue. Peng Xinwei suggests that the Manchus started issuing banknotes in response to the treasury of the Qing dynasty experiencing funding shortfalls which were occasioned by the a campaign to occupy the island of Zhoushan (near modern Shanghai). An annual amount of 128,000 guàn (貫) were issued, with a total sum of 1.28 million guàn being produced before they were abolished. The denominations of the Hubu guanpiao followed the pattern of the Ming dynasty period paper notes, but as historiographical sources about the early Qing era paper money are scarce, not much can be known about them.

After the Hubu guanpiao it was only rarely suggested by court officials to reintroduce paper money to the Qing Empire. Among these were Cai Zhiding (蔡之定) in 1814 and Wang Yide (王懿德) in his treatise on money known as Qianbi Chuyan (錢幣芻言). Peng Xinwei suggested that the Manchu rulers of the Qing were very much atavistic towards the inflationary pressure that the earlier Jurchen Empire experienced after they had abused their ability to print Jiaochao banknotes. Modern scholars argue that the banknotes issued during the Shunzhi period, while only brief, likely entrenched the reluctance of the Qing dynasty to issue banknotes because this issue also proved inflationary confirming their fears.

During this era, privately produced paper notes and promissory notes known as sipiao (私票) were used in the Chinese market that were mostly issued by private banks (錢莊) and other merchants. These banknotes were known as huipiao (會票, 'corporate notes', yinpiao (銀票, 'silver notes'), or qianpiao (錢票, 'cash notes'). As is usual for China, the names designating privately produced banknotes varied greatly across the country, with names being used such as pingtie (憑帖), duitie (兌帖), shangtie (上帖), hupingtie (壺瓶帖), or qitie (期帖). The denominations used on them varied greatly with some reaching as high as 5 diào (吊, 'string of cash coins'). It has been suggested by Taiwanese economic historian Lin Man-houng that Chinese money shops did not start the production of their own private banknotes until the end of the Qianlong period. These shops were very likely to have been more developed in Northern China, where these money shops produced banknotes which were mostly denominated in cash coins, while banknotes from Southern China tended to be denominated in taels of silver. It is also possible that private-order banknotes could have emerged earlier in the 18th century and that their presence would become very common by the 1820s.

By the middle of the 1800s various Western credit institutes and foreign banking corporations were operating in the Qing dynasty. During the late 1840s they began producing bills of exchange, promissory notes, or other forms of paper money for the Chinese market, which the Chinese referred to as fanpiao (番票). This introduced modern credit instruments to the traditional Chinese business world and greatly bolstered the reformist monetary discourse in China and would later be emulated by homegrown Chinese modern banks. This affected both the private market and the imperial Chinese bureaucracy.

=== Xianfeng era paper money ===
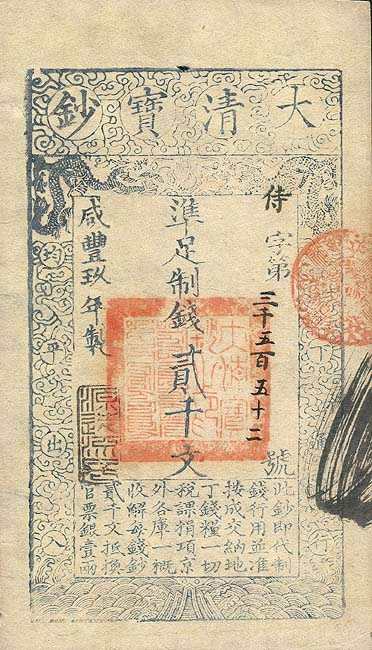
A Great Qing Treasure Note banknote of 2000 wén issued in 1859.

During most of the Manchu Qing dynasty, the monetary system largely relied mostly on copper-alloy cash coins (銅錢) denominated in wén (文) for small transactions and the general retail market and silver sycees (銀兩 or 銀錠) denominated in taels (兩) for larger transactions and the wholesale market. The general exchange rates between these two currencies fluctuated based both on time and on the location they were traded in, however the official exchange course was set by the imperial government as 1000 wén of copper-alloy cash coins for 1 tael of silver. Prior to 1800, the exchange rates were actually closer to 700 or 800 wén for 1 tael, but by the 19th century this had increased to 1200 wén. By the second half of the 19th century the imperial government of the Qing decided to experiment with cash coins that had a denomination higher than 1 wén which were known as Daqian, (大錢, 'large money') because of copper shortages, but as the shortages ran higher the government decided to reintroduce paper money.

Under the reign of the Xianfeng Emperor the Great Qing Treasure Note (大清寶鈔) was introduced. These were based on the earlier Great Ming Treasure Note from the Ming dynasty in style and layout and denominated in Zhiqian (制錢, 'standard cash coins') which were the high quality cash coins issued by the two central government mints in Beijing. For this reason they were popularly nicknamed qianpiao (錢票, 'cash notes'). These banknotes were initially issued in the denominations 250 wén, 500 wén, 1,000 wén, 1,500 wén, and 2,000 wén but as the Chinese economy was suffering from inflation denominations of 5,000 wén, 10,000 wén, 50,000 wén and 100,000 wén were introduced. The Great Qing Treasure Notes were imprinted with a statement that they were convertible into copper cash coins, however the statement also included the line that these banknotes could not be used for tax payment to the government. In reality the Great Qing Treasure Notes were not redeemable at all. Imperial China saw itself as being at the center of the universe and that all territory "Under the Heavens" (天下) and "Regions Within the Four Seas" (四海) were included within their domains, and for this reason the copper-alloy cash notes of this era bear the four characters Tian xia tong xing (天下通行) in their right border design, which translated into English means 'to circulate under the heavens'.

The Great Qing Treasure Note banknotes were supposed to enjoy circulation in all territories of the Qing dynasty. In order to facilitate this widespread adoption of the new paper currency, the Great Qing Treasure Note banknotes were issued to the general public through semi-official banks known as the Yu banks, (Note: They were known by the first syllable of their names, hence they are known as "Yu banks" (宇).) Qian banks, and Tian bank groups; these semi-official banks served as the fiscal agents of the Ministry of Revenue.

Strictly speaking, the Xianfeng-era banknotes issued by the official banks did not fall under the monies issued by the Qing government. However, the status and function of official banks was intertwined with that of the Daqian, Great Qing Treasure Note, and Hubu guanpiao, and the over-issue of banknotes by the official banks was probably the real reason for the Xianfeng inflation. Because the official banks were neither directly controlled by the Ministry of Revenue or supervised by them, and the fact that their operations were semi-commercial (as in they were operated by private merchants), few records of official banknotes exist today. Of the Tian (T'ien), Qian (Ch'ien), and Yu banks, the Qian banks were the oldest, as they were established in the year 1853 with four branch offices. The Qian banks were operated directly by the Ministry of Revenue for the purpose of salary payment of the bannermen. The Tian Group of banks was originally the royal pawnshop operated by the Imperial Household Department of the Qing dynasty (Neiwufu) in 1841, in order to increase the private vault of the imperial household (which completely was separate from the imperial government vault). The Tian Group was converted to official banks in 1854 in order to "facilitate" the Tian banks into the service of salary payment for government officials. The Yu Group of banks was established in 1855; the Yu banks were semi-official banks and were operated by private merchants with imperial charter and would (very infrequently) receive deposits from the Ministry of Revenue.

In reality however, these banking groups were both independent from the Chinese government and from each other and weren't under any form of imperial government supervision. There were five "Yu Banks" which were already existing Chinese private banks, while the Qian and Tian banks were large cash shops which received a government license to distribute the new paper currency. The Tian shops also fulfilled the purpose of being publicly funded pawnshops; they dealt in both pawned items and deposits. None of these institutions survived the inflation, drowning in an ever increasing sea of the Great Qing Treasure Note cash notes. By the year Xianfeng 11 (1861) these institutions had all closed as they went bankrupt. The fall of the Tian shops was quickened by Chinese peasants who, with the inflation affecting the paper money running rampant, opted to speedily redeem their pawned items with the depreciated Great Qing Treasure Note. This run on the Tian shops practically doomed the Chinese pawnshop business overnight.

The Tian, Qian, and Yu banks were all modeled on the private qianzhuang that were operating in Beijing at the time. The Tian, Qian, and Yu banks offered money exchange services, accepted deposits, and issued their own banknotes denominated in "metropolitan cash" (Jingqian), hence they were known as Jingpiao (京票) or Jingqianpiao (京錢票). Different banking groups would also deliver slightly different financial services and their funding situation also differed from each other. The banknotes issued by the Tian, Qian, and Yu banks were initially fully convertible, which made them similar to the already circulating zhuangpiao. Because of their similarities with the zhuangpiao, the official banknotes were both recognised and widely used in the market.

The difference of the Tian, Qian, and Yu banks from private financial institutions was that they were responsible for changing government paper notes (mostly the Great Qing Treasure Note cash notes) into real money (a combination of Daqian, iron cash coins, and official banknotes). With the Tian, Qian, and Yu banks acting as intermediaries, the government issued paper notes of Ministry of Revenue became convertible: they were linked to both the Daqian and a larger amount in unbacked official banknotes.

During this era another type of banknote was also introduced known as the yinpiao (銀票, 'silver notes') or yinchao (銀鈔, 'silver notes') which were issued by the Ministry of Revenue and were commonly known as Hubu guanpiao (戶部官票) for this fact. These silver notes were issued in denominations of values 1 tael, 3 taels, 5 taels, 10 taels, and 50 taels. These banknotes had a guideline written in both Manchu and Mandarin Chinese declaring that they had to be discounted by 2% when they exchanged into Beijing market silver and when counted against the Kuping tael, the yinpiao notes were discounted at 6 per cent. The conversion rate between copper-alloy cash notes (錢鈔) and silver tael notes (官票) was two cash notes to one silver note, these banknotes exchangeable into copper cash coins and silver, but only in certain institutions in Beijing under the Ministry of Revenue. The term chaopiao (鈔票) was first used exclusively for paper notes issued by the imperial government, but later on was also used to refer to privately produced paper notes issued by private market banks and merchant companies.

These banknotes were all introduced in 1854 and during the first few months after they were minted, they started being distributed in the form of salary for both government officials and the military; however, the imperial government itself did not accept them as a method of payment including for taxation, likewise many provincial governments also refused to accept the new paper currency. Later on these banknotes were slowly gaining acceptance throughout the Qing Empire. Consequentially due to their limited acceptability these paper notes were severely discounted in the private market sector, if accepted at all. In 1855 a cash note of 1000 wén or a silver note of 1 tael were just accepted for 450 Beijing cash (Jingqian, 京錢) or 200-300 standard cash coins by the private market. The market value of paper currency would consistently decrease as the imperial government kept printing both more of it and higher denominations, and by 1861 the government mandated paper money had overstayed their usefulness and consequently was completely abolished. During this year yinchao had already disappeared from general circulation, and a 1,000 wén cash note had a market value of as little as 26 wén, or 52 wén at the most.

During the period when the Great Qing Treasure Note and Hubu guanpiao series of banknotes were introduced, nine government banks in Beijing (of which four were newly established institutions) started issuing another type of cash note known as the guanhao qianpiao (官號錢票). These cash notes were backed by reserves kept in Daqian rather than standard cash coins. The guanhao qianpiao were modeled after privately produced banknotes known as the sihao qianpiao (私號錢票). These private cash notes would also continue to circulate alongside the new currencies. Both the guanhao qianpiao and sihao qianpaio were based on the Jingqian accounting unit of cash coins as was used in Beijing. This meant that, for example, if one were to exchange 15,000 wén worth of guanhao qianpaio or sihao qianpaio cash notes in the year 1861, that person would only receive 7500 wén worth of physical coins (or 750 cash coins of 10 wén to be more precise). This practice was asymmetrical as government documents noted a string of cash coins as 1000 wén while paying out only 500 wén for these cash notes. Both the Great Qing Treasure Note cash notes and Hubu guanpiao tael notes continued to be accepted in the practice of office selling and would continue to circulate in the provinces of China proper as non-interest bearing debentures until 1867–1868.

As the government of the Qing dynasty saw that banknotes that were denominated in "metropolitan cash" could circulate well in the Chinese market, the Qing government, besides promoting government issued Great Qing Treasure Note cash notes, also started to focus on the promotion of official banknotes with three major measures. The first of these measures was having the imperial government place large amounts of capital into the Qian and Tian banks and then encouraging them to produce more banknotes. These newly produced Qian and Tian banknotes were then directly transferred to the Qing Treasury vault and were used to pay for imperial government expenditures. The second measure undertaken to help promote official banknotes was depositing money with the Yu banks, as these banks primarily dealt with exchanging Great Qing Treasure Note cash notes for their own banknotes. The third and final measure undertaken to help promote official banknotes was establishing the Copper Donation Bureau, or juantongju (捐銅局) in Mandarin. The Copper Donation Bureau was originally created to encourage the citizens of the Qing dynasty to donate their copper in exchange for titles and/or degrees; afterwards the Copper Donation Bureau became solely responsible for receiving all kinds of donations to the Qing government, such as the juanna (捐納) and the juanshu (捐輸). With these donations, the Copper Donation Bureau had enough reserves to issue its own banknotes (similar to the official banknotes) that were also put directly into the imperial government's Treasury to be used for its expenditures, where they were mostly used to pay for the bannermen's salaries.

The total amount of banknotes issued by the Qian, Tian, and Yu banks is difficult to estimate because none of their bank account books have survived into the modern age. However, the number of official banknotes that were printed specifically for use in expenditures of the government of the Qing dynasty can be found in the imperial treasury records. The total number of official banknotes issued through government expenditure (from both the Qian and Tian Groups of official banks and the Copper Donation Bureau) was the equivalent to 31,953,038 taels of silver. As this rough estimate does not include the official banknotes that circulated in the private market through the money exchange services of these banks, and in particular the amount of banknotes issued by the Yu banks, the total quantity of official banknotes that circulated in the contemporary Chinese market was likely much higher.

The reserves that the Qing government deposited into the Qian and Tian banks were not enough; government documents stated that the Qian banks received government endowments of 20,000 diào (吊) in Jingqian as initial capital directly from the imperial Chinese Treasury from the Ministry of Revenue. The government documents do not specify how often they pumped money into the official banks, nor is it specified in which form of currency the payment to these banks was realised. The imperial treasury records show that in 1853 a total number of 13,784 taels of silver was transferred from the government to the Qian and Tian banks "as their 20% reserve money".

While the banknotes of the Qian, Tian, and Yu banks were denominated in "metropolitan cash" (Jingqian) or diào, in the official government treasury accounts all figures for banknotes were kept with chuàn (串) as the main unit of account. The figures for these official banknotes were converted by the official ratio between Jingqian and chuàn, which was 2,000:1 (this means that the official ratio between a diào and a chuàn is 2:1). The reported total amount of official banknotes possessed by the imperial treasury was 63,906,076 chuàn, and was equivalent to 31,953,038 taels of silver at the official government-set exchange rate between copper-alloy cash coins and silver in 1853. The Chinese government records were deliberately kept vague to cover up the obvious fact that there was a shortage of capital.

The reserves of the semi-private Yu banks seemed to be the weakest of all the official banks: they had an initial capital reserve of about 10,000 chuàn; the Yu banks would later receive government deposits that were composed mainly of iron cash coins and lead cash coins. Because of their low capital reserves, the Yu banks experienced the worst case of over-issuing paper money, which caused a great demand for exchanging Great Qing Treasure Note cash notes against a limited reserve of mainly Daqian and Zhiqian. After a number of bank runs, the Yu banks all folded in 1857; subsequently the Qian and Tian banks all folded due to bank runs in June 1861.

During the early Tongzhi era (同治, 1862–1874), the provincial governments of Henan and Sichuan completely stopped accepting paper money for tax payments and again began requiring tax payments exclusively in silver, yet the provincial government of Zhili continued to accept the paper notes for tax payments, at least in a certain proportion to silver, which was preferred. The Xianfeng era paper currency was ultimately given up in 1868.

=== Foreign banks and the currency reforms of the late 19th and early 20th centuries ===
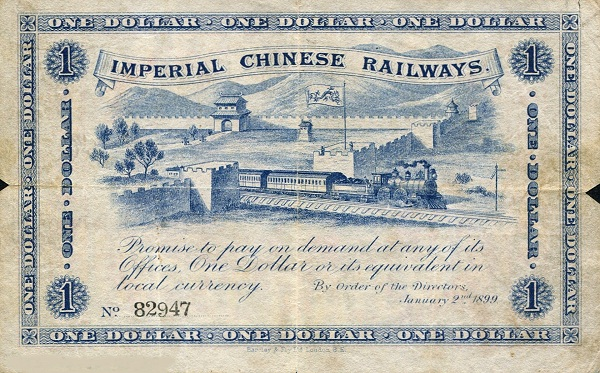
A banknote of 1 dollar issued by the Imperial Chinese Railways in 1899.

During the final decades of the 19th century, private Chinese banks and merchant companies used two types of paper money for their daily exchanges; one type was denominated in Chinese money and the other type was denominated in foreign currencies. Various foreign banks in China, which were locally known as yanghang (洋行) or waishang yinhang (外商銀行), issued paper money for local circulation. These foreign financial institutions both challenged the Chinese banking system and set an example for them to improve themselves. Foreign banks were crucial in laying the foundation for the rise of modern Chinese banks and the popularisation of banknotes in the Qing dynasty in the early 20th century. These foreign banks included Mackellar (麥加利), the Hong Kong and Shanghai Banking Corporation (匯豐銀行), the Deutsch-Asiatische Bank (德華銀行), and the City Bank of New York (花旗) produced notes denominated in silver taels (銀兩) and Chinese silver dollars (銀元). The banknotes of Mackellar, the HSBC, and the Deutsch-Asiatische Bank were denominated in 1 tael, 5 taels, 10 taels, 50 taels, and 100 taels, while the banknotes issued by the City Bank of New York were denominated in 1 yuan, 3 yuan, 10 yuan, 50 yuan, and 100 yuan. These banknotes were commonly used in the region around the Yangtze River. Meanwhile, in Manchuria the Russo-Chinese Bank (華俄道勝銀行) issued Russian ruble notes (盧布票) and the Japanese banks operating in the region issued military notes (軍用票). In Southern China the Yokohama Specie Bank (横浜正金銀行) issued gold notes (金票) and Hong Kong notes (香幣) for the local market. Foreign banks established branches throughout imperial China in order to facilitate trade with the home country of those operating these companies. These credit institutions were not permitted to operate wherever they wished to set up an office and had no right to do business outside their assigned jurisdictions as their operations were limited to the "treaty ports" which the Chinese government had set aside under the terms of the indemnity laws enforced upon the Qing dynasty after losing two opium wars. Operating entirely within the foreign-held enclaves of China, these banks were not subject to Chinese law, rather they were operating under the banking laws of their respective mother countries. Some foreign banks also maintained several branches in multiple treaty ports, which permitted a bank in one locality to discount its own banknotes from another branch. Despite the restrictions placed upon foreign banks their operations, with few exceptions, were so successful that the Chinese people preferred them over "indigenous" Chinese banks. Because their operations were so reliably managed, the banknotes issued by the foreign banks were in great demand and consequently circulated throughout all of Qing territory.

The main financial institutions serving as intermediaries between the Europeans and the Chinese for financial purposes were the qianzhuang (錢莊, known in English as "money shops" or "native banks"); the qianzhuang tended to be small proprietorships which had unlimited liability. These financial institutions were often sparsely aligned along family and linguistic ties and they were rarely patronised by the local government authorities. Larger qianzhuang would issue company scrip against individual deposits which were known as zhuangpiao (莊票, 'shop coupon'). This scrip was also accepted by proximate shops, but to cash these out would take around 10–15 days after it was given to the shop. This was because couriers would have to liaise with the issuing shop in order to rule out fraudulent zhuangpiao notes. During the 1860s the qianzhuang of Shanghai started looking to the foreign banking companies as a source of capital, and by 1888, sixty-two of the largest qianzhuang had engaged in borrowing millions of taels in silver in loans from foreign banks on a yearly basis. The qianzhuang would mobilise their domestic resources to an order of magnitude that would exceed the paid-up capital that they initially received several times over; this happened mostly through issuing banknotes and deposit receipts. British banks operating in China would often accept zhuangpiao as a security for the loans they gave out to qianzhuang. This makes it plausible that chop loans originated because of the widely used prevalence of zhuangpiao in China; British banks could not simply reject them when they were being offered to them by foreign merchants in China. During this era foreign banking companies tended to have an account with at least one qianzhuang, since only the guilds operated by them could clear the large number of zhuangpiao forms that were circulating in the city of Shanghai. This happened through a rather elaborate daily mechanism which was dubbed huihua (非匯, 'draft exchange').

The main business foreign banks conducted themselves in was the handling of bills of exchange for which foreign banks enjoyed a practical monopoly in the lucrative foreign exchange business. The foreign banks were in such a dominant position that they dominated exchange rates between China and the outside world. As China was made up of many different types of currency in its different geographical areas, there existed a great opportunity for profit which foreigners benefited from. The currency situation in China made this profitability possible for the simple reason that in China hard money was always viewed as a commodity which only coincidentally served as a medium of exchange. This meant that a foreign bank's buying and selling rates on currency in circulation differed, generally returning a net profit to the bank on each and every transaction dealing with money exchange. Additional sources of income for foreign banks operating in China were derived from floating loans for the cash-starved government of the Qing dynasty and by transmitting remittances to and from China.

The monetary units yuan (元 and 圓) were first seen during the late 18th century and were used on foreign-issued banknotes. In 1895 the first Chinese banknotes denominated in yuan (圓) were issued, by the government-owned State Railway Company of Beiyang (北洋鐵軌官路局). These banknotes were printed in London and are generally seen as the first modern paper bills of China, as they are designed horizontally and in a much smaller format than the traditional Chinese paper notes, and are inscribed in Mandarin Chinese and English ("Imperial Chinese Railways"). In 1895 the Central Paper Money Office in Tainan (臺南官銀錢票總局) in Taiwan issued banknotes denominated in the currency unit dayuan (大圓, 'big yuan'), and had the denominations 1 dayuan, 5 dayuan, and 10 dayuan; however, these banknotes followed the traditional design of Chinese paper notes.

The Imperial Bank of China (中華帝國銀行, IBC) was founded in 1897 based on a suggestion made by Sheng Xuanhuai (盛宣懷, 1844–1916). In 1898 it began issuing the first Chinese commercial cheques (兌換券) which were denominated in taels or in yuan. The IBC is also notable for being the first Chinese bank to order its banknotes from foreign printing bureaus. In 1913 (after the fall of the Qing dynasty) the Imperial Bank of China was renamed the Commercial Bank of China (中國商業銀行). Various provincial authorities also started issuing local paper money during this era. In the province of Hubei, the local money office (官錢局) started producing banknotes of 1000 wén which used the traditional Chinese banknote designs. Later, in 1899, the Zhang Zhidong (張之洞), Viceroy of Huguang ordered the local money office to also start making modern-style banknotes. The production of these was outsourced to the Empire of Japan using high-quality methods; however, the design of these banknotes was still vertical as opposed to the horizontal banknotes used elsewhere. In the province of Guangdong, a series of modern-style banknotes was introduced in 1904 which were denominated in 1 yuan, 5 yuan, and 10 yuan. These banknotes were printed by the Japanese Ministry of the Treasury (日本大藏省), but unlike the notes printed for Hubei had a Western-style vertical design.

The principal function of a foreign bank was to promote and finance foreign trade. For this reason foreign banks in Qing China could only finance projects within the treaty ports and were not allowed to participate in those beyond without sanction of the imperial Chinese government. In this way foreign banks did not compete with the interests of the local Chinese commercial banks. Typically, a foreign bank would return an annual profit of from 15% to 20% to its shareholders. The funds held on deposit by foreign banks were always large, and compared to the funds of Chinese commercial banks were extremely secure, as the bulk of them represented Chinese customs and salt revenues held as collateral against foreign loans. Because of this security, the banknotes issued by foreign banks were in great demand by the Chinese causing them to circulate freely throughout the Chinese empire, in contrast to the limitations placed upon the banks' operations which were only allowed inside of the treaty ports.

During the late Qing dynasty period the old paper notes remained in common usage; these included the traditional privately produced paper notes which were printed on one side of the bill issued by merchant banks known as qianzhuang (錢莊), yinhao (銀號), and shangpiao (商票) and pawn shops known as diandang (典當), as well as the old-style banknotes issued by provincial government institutions, to the modern banknotes which were introduced by a dozen or so of foreign banks operating in China and modern Chinese banks which were created in very large numbers in the later years of the 19th century. Furthermore, there were also banknotes which were brought into the Chinese financial markets by imperial government-owned firms like railway companies, and foreign bills coming to China through the trade ports like Shanghai. The large spectrum of these types of paper money reflected the structure of the general Chinese credit market in the late Qing period. The traditional Chinese credit institutes were local qianzhuang banks, yinhao banks, piaohao banks, and pawnshops, of which a considerably number was always to be found in each city across the Chinese Empire. Many provincial governments founded their own local provincial, state-owned banks which were known as guanqianju (官錢局) or guanyinhao (官銀號); in some provinces even several modern credit institutes were to be found, like the Yuning Bank (裕寧官銀錢局) and the Yusu Bank (裕蘇官銀錢局) in the province of Jiangsu. Quite a few of these provincial credit companies opened branches in other provinces due to their success.

After it became clear to the Qing government that their finances were not going to remain self-sufficient in light of the two Opium Wars, the First Sino-Japanese War, and the Boxer Rebellion, the imperial Chinese court decided that it would have to raise capital through the foreign banking corporations operating in China. The Chinese defeats during these wars were perceived as being unexpected by the Qing government and threw it into a state of turmoil; the Qing was plunged deeply into debt to pay for war indemnities making the need for foreign capital great. The foreign banking corporations that had been established in the preceding decades then saw the opportunity to quickly expand their business in China to meet the Chinese government's demands. By the end of the 19th century there were a total of 19 foreign banks operating in China with 101 branches spread over the important trading cities. These foreign bank corporations enjoyed the protection of extraterritoriality laws and were able to issue their own banknotes to circulate within Qing territory, had the ability to take in large deposits, and were trusted to manage the Maritime Customs revenue and Chinese government transfers. These foreign banks also served as acting receiving agents for war indemnities which were owed by the Qing government to foreign nations. The largest loans that were negotiated under the Chinese "borrowing foreign capital" policy were through the Hongkong and Shanghai Banking Corporation (HSBC). Between the years 1895 and 1911 HSBC concluded a total of 112 loans to the government of the Qing dynasty which were worth 1,806,000,000 silver dollars.

Of paramount principle among the business interests of the Chinese government during the Qing dynasty was the financing of 2,800 miles of newly constructed railroads in the Yangtze valley. All these expensive loans with various foreign banking corporations were secured by China's salt tax as well as Chinese customs revenues. By making so many loans to the Chinese government, foreign banking companies were able to establish what were essentially spheres of influence in different regions of China, with the Russians in the northeast (specifically Manchuria), the United Kingdom which enjoyed more influence in the Yangtze valley, the Japanese Empire which exercised their influence in the northern and central regions of China, and the French who were more influential in the southern regions.

From the mid-nineteenth century up to the beginning of World War II, no fewer than twelve foreign countries maintained banks in China. Due to a large number of unequal treaties, foreign banks enjoyed extraterritoriality rights when operating in China, which also included the freedom to issue their own banknotes. The influx of foreign banks into China also brought with them a new type of financing which became an inspiration for Chinese entrepreneurs to found similar financial institutions in China itself; some of these were government-owned institutions, while others were privately run. These institutions were the made up of the following banks:

- Commercial Bank of China (中國通商銀行);
- Da-Qing Bank (大清銀行);
- Bank of Communications (交通銀行);
- Ningpo Commercial Bank (四明銀行);
- Bank of Territorial Development (殖邊銀行);
- Hsing Yeh Bank of Che Kiang or Industrial Bank of Che Kiang (浙江興業銀行) in Zhejiang;
- Che Kiang Bank (浙江銀行) in Zhejiang;
- Sin Chun Bank of China (華商上海信成銀行) in Shanghai;
- Hsin I Savings Bank (信義工商儲蓄銀行) in Hankou;
- Beijing Savings Bank (北京儲蓄銀行) in Beijing;
- Baoshan Yinhang (寶善銀行) in Beijing;
- Hetai Yinhang (和太銀行) in Yangzhou;
- Chinese Mercantile Bank (華商通業銀行) in Yangzhou.

Despite the fact that the number of these banks was not very high, their business proved to have a great impact on the modernisation of the financial and monetary system of China during the late imperial and the early Republican era. Even certain government-owned institutions like the railway corporations can be seen as modern credit institutes because they issued their own modernised paper money.

An alternative narrative argues that privately issued banknotes by native banks and local money shops had become a fundamental in the late-Imperial Chinese currency system a long time before the entry of Western banking corporations into China during the late 1840s. An important hypothesis of this alternative narrative speculates that the Chinese population at the time did not trust government-issued banknotes, while banknotes issued by established private banks, shops and financiers tended to be well-accepted by the general populace.

By the end of the 19th century provincial governments started setting up their own note issuing banks like the Hupeh Provincial Bank (湖北官錢局, Hubei Guan-Qianju) with branches in Wuchang and Hankou. The Hubei Guan-Qianju issued a series of banknotes known as the Hubei guanpiao (湖北官票). These banknotes were denominated in taels for silver and strings for copper-alloy cash coins. The Hubei guanpiao was abolished over a decade after the fall of the Qing dynasty in 1927 with the bankruptcy of the Hubei Guan-Qianju.

China signed the Mackay Treaty with the United Kingdom on 5 September 1902. This treaty included a provision where the imperial Chinese government would create a uniform coinage "which shall be legal tender in payment of all duties taxes and other obligations throughout the Empire by British and Chinese subjects". The idea behind this provision was to remove obstacles for trading in the form of a very diverse coinage system throughout China. The reality was that subsidiary production of coinage was not so lucrative to begin with. Despite the provisions set for creating a uniform coinage, the treaty made no reference to banknotes. During this era both local and foreign businesses demanded the creation of a uniform Chinese currency system, which would not occur during the Qing dynasty era. There was a major question at the time whether this uniform currency system would be placed on the silver standard or the gold standard. The introduction of a uniform currency also meant that the responsibility over monetary affairs would be completely transferred over to the hands of the imperial government which at the time was heavily in debt and did not have any grip on its own finances.

=== Establishing a national bank ===
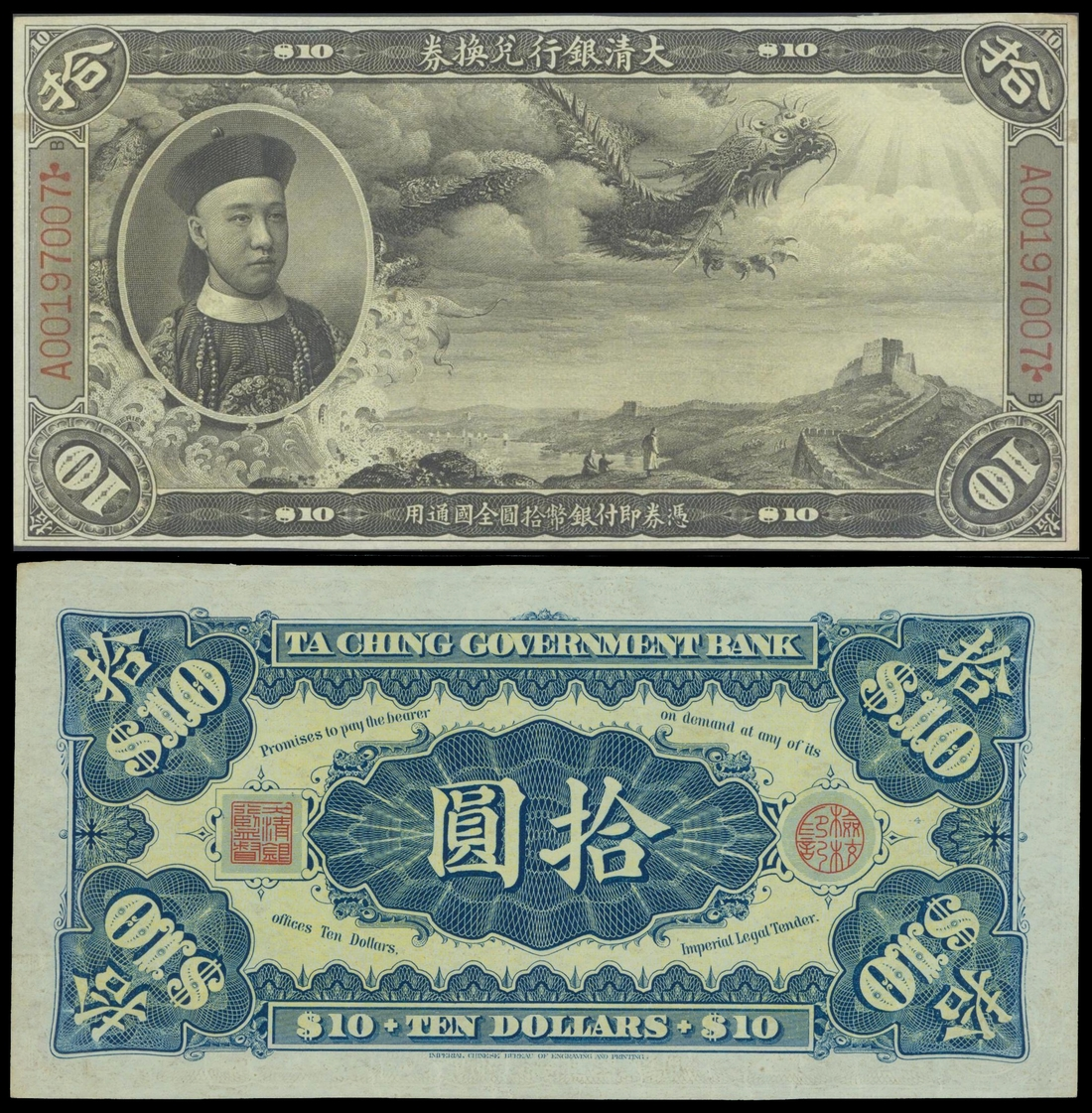
A 10 dollar banknote issued by the Da-Qing Bank depicting Zaifeng, Prince Chun issued in 1910.

During the later part of the Qing dynasty era there was a discussion on whether or not the imperial Chinese government would have to establish a national bank, which it finally did in 1905. Peng Shu (彭述) stated before the introduction of new banknotes that the national bank would have to keep sufficient reserves in "tangible" money (現金) at all times. The large number of private notes that were being produced all over the empire was to be restricted by introducing a stamp duty (印花稅). The reformer Liang Qichao campaigned for the government of the Qing dynasty to emulate the Western world and Japan by embracing the gold standard, unifying the currencies of China, and issuing government-backed banknotes with a ⅓ metallic reserve. At the end of 1905 the Da-Qing Bank was founded, and the production of the banknotes was entrusted to the prints of the Beiyang Newspaper (北洋報局) in Northern China. In 1906 the government of the Qing dynasty sent students to Japan to be educated in modern printing techniques, with the aim to have the Shanghai Commercial Press (上海商務印書館) print the cheques of the Ministry's Bank. The Da-Qing Bank were still issuing two different types of banknotes. One series was denominated in tael, known as the yinliang piao (銀兩票), and had denominations of 1 tael, 5 taels, 10 taels, 50 taels, and 100 taels. The other series was denominated in yuan, known as the yinyuan piao (銀元票) and was issued in denominations of 1 yuan, 5 yuan, 10 yuan, 50 yuan, and 100 yuan. In the year 1907 the Da-Qing Bank of the Ministry of Revenue was renamed the Da-Qing Bank (大清銀行); accordingly the inscription on all banknotes had to be changed to reflect this.

Following the Chinese tradition of issuing new money in a new reign, the Xuantong administration had the design of the official Da-Qing Bank paper notes somewhat changed to herald in the new emperor. The new design was inspired by the designs of the banknotes of the United States dollar of this era; some banknotes showed the portrait of Li Hongzhang, and others depicted that of Zaifeng, Prince Chun who at the time was the current Chinese Minister of Finance. At the eve of the Xinhai Revolution in 1911, there were 5,400,000 tael worth of yinliang banknotes circulating in China, and 12,400,000 yuan in yinyuan banknotes.

== List of banknotes denominated in copper-alloy cash coins issued during the Xianfeng era ==
List of banknotes denominated in copper-alloy cash coins issued during the Xianfeng era:

Xianfeng cash notes (1853–1859)
Denomination	Years of production	Approximate size (in millimeters)	Image
500 wén	Xianfeng 3–8	130 x 232	
1000 wén	Xianfeng 3–8	138 x 240	
1500 wén	Xianfeng 4	126 x 233	
2000 wén	Xianfeng 3–9	138 x 245	
5000 wén	Xianfeng 6–9	138 x 247	
10,000 wén	Xianfeng 7–9	141 x 248	
50,000 wén	Xianfeng 7–9	147 x 267	
100,000 wén	Xianfeng 7–9	145 x 277	

== List of banknotes denominated in silver taels issued during the Xianfeng era ==
List of banknotes denominated in silver tael sycees issued during the Xianfeng era:

Xianfeng tael notes (1853–1858)
Denomination	Years of production	Approximate size (in millimeters)	Image
1 liǎng	Xianfeng 3, Xianfeng 4, Xianfeng 5, Xianfeng 6	151 x 250	
3 liǎng	Xianfeng 3, Xianfeng 4, Xianfeng 5, Xianfeng 6, Xianfeng 7, Xianfeng 8	152 x 248	
5 liǎng	Xianfeng 3, Xianfeng 4, Xianfeng 5, Xianfeng 6, Xianfeng 7	154 x 250	
10 liǎng	Xianfeng 3, Xianfeng 4, Xianfeng 5, Xianfeng 6	190 x 315	
50 liǎng	Xianfeng 3, Xianfeng 4, Xianfeng 5, Xianfeng 6	190 x 310	

== Banknotes produced by Belgian banks ==
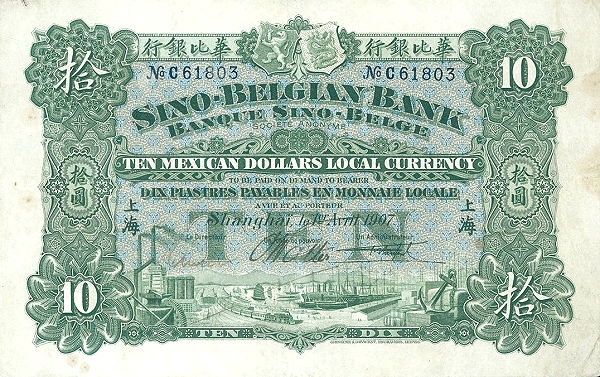
A banknote issued by Shanghai Branch of the Sino-Belgian Bank (Banque Sino-Belge) denominated in "Mexican dollars".

The Kingdom of Belgium, despite being a small country, was a state with a rather highly developed industrial base and which also enjoyed being a centre of international trade during the later 19th and early 20th centuries. The Sino-Belgian Bank (French: Banque Sino-Belge) was founded by King Leopold for doing business in remittances and conducting international trade; the Sino-Belgian Bank belied its name because it did not have any indigenous Chinese participation at all, making it a purely Belgian company. Following the Boxer Rebellion in 1900 the Sino-Belgian Bank set up a branch in Shanghai, where its primary business was in handling out long-term loans for the construction of railways in China. Other branches were later opened in the cities of Beijing, Tianjin, and Hankou. Belgium itself benefited from this as it exported materials to China, especially construction materials which were used for railroads. In the scramble for Chinese railroad concessions the Sino-Belgian Bank worked closely together with the Compagnie General de Chemins de Fer et de Tramways en Chine to issue bonds, first in 1903 and once more in 1913. These company bonds were used to finance Chinese railroad construction during the early 20th century.

The Sino-Belgian Bank issued banknotes in the year 1908 with denominations of 1 dollar, 5 dollars, 10 dollars, and 50 dollars at all of its branches as Mexican dollars, alluding to the old Spanish silver dollars that were traditionally in wide circulation across the Far East, even during Ming dynasty times. They initially emanated from the Philippines as part of the Spanish East Indies in the Spanish colonial empire from the Manila-Acapulco Galleon Trade with Mexico that minted the silver coins, which were usually mined in Bolivia or Peru. These banknotes mostly circulated within the Shanghai International Settlement and the Shanghai French Concession.

In 1912 the Sino-Belgian Bank changed its name to the Banque Belge Pour l'Étranger. Banknotes issued after 1912 during the Republican period carried the new name of the bank to reflect this change. At the Shanghai International Settlement the circulation of paper notes was by the Banque Belge Pour l'Étranger never allowed to exceed 1,000,000 dollars.

The Sino-Belgian Bank/Banque Belge Pour l'Étranger enjoyed a positive reputation in China and its banknotes were at all times well-received and could easily be redeemed at the bank's offices. The Banque Belge Pour l'Étranger was forced to cease its business when the Chinese republican government took over the Chinese economy from foreign management in the year 1935.

== Banknotes produced by British banks ==
British banknotes in China during the Qing dynasty were by far the most common and the most highly esteemed of all banknotes of foreign origin circulating in China at the time. Early British banknotes that circulated in China became very influential for later Chinese banknotes and were essential for informing Chinese monetary thinking later in the 19th century and early 20th century.

=== Early British Indian banks in China ===
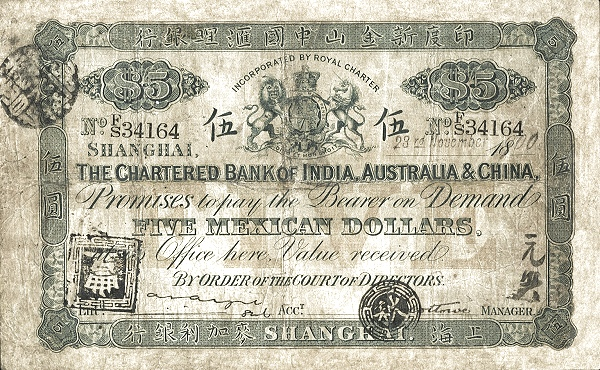
A banknote of 5 Mexican dollars issued by the Shanghai Branch of the Chartered Bank of India, Australia & China.

At one time there were never less than 15 British-owned banks that did business in the Qing dynasty; seven of these banks were from the British Indian Empire. After the conclusions of the First and Second Opium Wars the United Kingdom forced a number of "unequal treaties" on the Qing demanding trade rights with several Chinese ports which became known as treaty ports. Soon after these agreements were signed, the leading merchant houses of British India, setting themselves up as private banks, pursued new sources of revenue in imperial China. Both the central and provincial governments held very little restraint in printing paper money during the Xianfeng period; this made it so that the Bund in the foreign concessions of Shanghai was one of the few places in China where paper money had actually been standardised. This also led to the Bund being one of the few places where paper money could actually be exchanged for silver trade dollars or silver bullion of quality that could be verified without regard to the outside political climate. This situation was not much different in the city of Shanghai until the first British banks established offices there.

The first of these, the Oriental Bank Corporation, was quick to establish a branch in Qing territory. The Oriental Bank Corporation went bankrupt in 1884. The London-based Chartered Mercantile Bank of India, London and China opened a branch in the British crown colony of Hong Kong in 1845 and some time after the branch's establishment commenced issuing banknotes denominated in Spanish milled dollars as Mexican dollars due to the former wide circulation of Spanish silver dollar, even in Ming dynasty times, through trade with the Philippines as part of the Spanish East Indies in the Spanish colonial empire that minted the silver coins from Mexico. This series of paper notes was based upon the Carlos silver dollar, which at the time was still the generally preferred medium of exchange among Chinese merchants. The Chartered Mercantile Bank of India, London and China later opened a branch in the British concession of the port city of Shanghai in October 1854, where they issued both silver dollar and tael banknotes.

Between 1845 and 1866 many other British banks that were based in India started setting up offices in cities along the coastline of China such as Guangzhou and Hong Kong along the Pearl River Delta and Shanghai along the Yangtze River Delta. Among these Indian-based banks were the Agra and United Services Bank (established in 1853, but went bankrupt in 1866), the Asiatic Banking Corporation, the Chartered Mercantile Bank of India, London and China (established in 1853), the Bank of Hindustan, China and Japan, and the Chartered Bank of India, Australia and China (established in 1857). The Comptoir d'Escompte de Paris from France also started operating in China during this era. These banks functioned as the main financiers of contemporary trade between the Far East (especially Qing China) and the West (Europe, North America, South America, and Australia). By the year 1866 these early British banks had all opened up branches in the Chinese harbour towns of Hankou, Hong Kong, and Shanghai. The geographic position of the latter of these ports gave it a particularly advantageous position as it is located in the Yangtze River Delta and the Grand Canal, meaning that goods that went through this port would be able to reach the entirety of China. The offices of these banks were all concentrated in an area of Shanghai known as the Bund. In the beginning the need for the services of these foreign banks in China was restricted to only trade opium from British India into Chinese territory and exports of Chinese tea to markets across the entire world. Because tea could be exported during the summer months, and as opium imports became increasingly restricted by the government of the Qing dynasty, many of these early Anglo-Indian banks in China went bankrupt or had to be reorganised.

The Oriental Bank Corporation, which was the first foreign bank to conduct its business in China by opening a local branch, also opened up a branch in the Bund where it then started issuing its own banknotes. The British-owned Chartered Mercantile Bank of India, London and China which issued the banknotes of the Hong Kong dollar from 1859 until 1892 was later reorganised as the Mercantile Bank of India and stopped operating in China. After the fall of the Qing dynasty and when the Republic of China's rule over the mainland came to an end, the only British Indian bank still operating in China was the Chartered Bank of India, Australia and China.

The Asiatic Banking Corporation had become dependent on its trade with the Confederate States of America (CSA) and eventually tied its fate to the success of this nation which lost its war of independence in 1865. At the time of the American Civil War the textile mills of the United Kingdom were wholly dependent upon cotton shipped from the Confederate States of America. However the Confederates did not wish to supply cotton to the British unless they were seen as a recognised state which the British government refused; because of this, the British decided to invest more into the cotton industry of India and Ceylon, attempting to create a whole cotton-raising culture overnight to make up for the lack of Confederate cotton. The price of cotton in the United Kingdom went up immensely as the demand could not be met with the supply. Speculation in cotton futures at the time started to run rife, of these futures the Asiatic Bank was the principal provider of capital.

After the American Civil War ended with a decisive victory for the United States of America in 1865, the Asiatic Bank had to close its doors in 1866 as the cheap cotton from the Southern United States was freely available on the British market again, ending the experiment with the production of cotton in British India and Ceylon. All banknotes issued by the Asiatic Bank to circulate in Qing China had an identical design but had different branch names on them.

The banknotes issued by these early Anglo-Indian banks which did business in the Qing dynasty between 1845 and 1870 are today exceedingly rare and are only seldom offered, making them beyond the reach of the average banknote collector due to their scarcity. The quantity of paper money channeled into Chinese monetary traffic by these Anglo-Indian banks was comparatively small and in some cases exceedingly minor which explains their current rarity.

=== Later British banks ===
The second biggest British bank in China was during the Qing dynasty was the Chartered Bank of India, Australia and China, which was originally formed in British India by a royal charter issued under the reign of Queen Victoria of the United Kingdom in 1857. In 1858 the Chartered Bank of India, Australia and China opened an office in the British crown colony of Hong Kong and in 1861 the Chartered Bank of India, Australia and China was granted the right to issue banknotes for Hong Kong. Sizable portions of some of its early business involved the discounting of bills for the export of the narcotic opium from British India to the Qing dynasty which generated a significant amount of profit.

From 1861 the Chartered Bank of India, Australia and China was granted the ability to produce Notes Payable to Bearer on Demand at all of their offices. The banknotes produced by the Chartered Bank of India, Australia and China were at all times within the safeguards obligated by the colonial British banking regulations and were generally met with great acceptance in Hong Kong and China, with a notable exception being the city of Shanghai, where the local Han Chinese population was known for holding a prejudice against foreign-produced paper money. This negative perception of foreign paper money was in part because of the refusal of the imperial Chinese Customs House stationed there to accept them as valid currency in payment of dues. As a result of this negative bias by the authorities, there was never a large amount of foreign banknotes in circulation in Shanghai. With the sole exception of Shanghai, the fiat money issued by the Chartered Bank of India, Australia and China, which may have been circulating in small quantities, was highly regarded by the Chinese public.

The National Bank of China Limited was an institution of which today only very little is known. The very existence of this bank would not have been known if it were not for the discovery of several salesman's samples in the beginning of the 21st century which mention its existence. It is known to have been operating in British Hong Kong with an additional branch in the city of Shanghai. Richard von Glahn reports that the National Bank of China Limited was established by the British in colonial Hong Kong in 1891 and disbanded in 1911. At the time of its disestablishment the National Bank of China Limited had a minor amount of paid-up capital worth only £600,000. The banknotes of this bank in circulation were always small in number. Upon closing its doors permanently all banknotes produced by the bank seemed to have been fully accounted for, which is a most unusual thing to happen in China; this explains the virtual non-existence of the National Bank of China Limited today.

The central government of the Qing dynasty only attempted to regulate Chinese banks and its currency near the end of the dynasty. By the time that the Qing started finally implementing financial reforms, China was beholden to the mercy of foreign powers; because of this the issue of foreign banknotes in China and restrictions on foreign banking and foreign banks (including British banks) in general were generally not made.

=== The Hongkong and Shanghai Banking Corporation ===
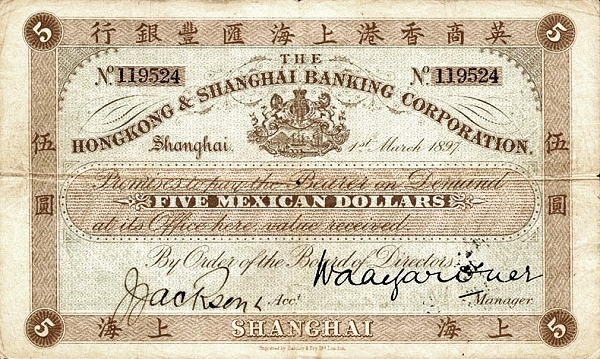
A banknote of 5 Mexican dollars issued by the Shanghai branch of the Hongkong and Shanghai Banking Corporation during the 1890s.

The banknotes produced by the Hongkong and Shanghai Banking Corporation (HSBC) had seen extensive circulation in the territory of the Qing dynasty from the 1870s and later. In 1864 the Hongkong and Shanghai Banking Corporation was established by the Scottish Thomas Sutherland to finance Far East trade and would later grow to become both the largest and most influential of all the foreign banks during the Qing dynasty era. The Traditional Chinese characters for the Hongkong and Shanghai Banking Corporation were 匯豐銀行 (pinyin: Huìfēng Yínháng; Jyutping: Wui^{6}fung^{1} Ngan^{4}hong^{4}, which the British pronounced as Wayfung after the Cantonese pronunciation). These Chinese characters could be translated as "abundant remittances".

Over the following years the HSBC became a banking leader in East and Southeast Asia. This happened because the Hongkong and Shanghai Banking Corporation was a key player in many major events in the region, such as acting as banker for the Hong Kong government from 1880 onwards, establishing the first bank in the Kingdom of Siam in 1888 where it printed the first banknotes of the Siamese tical, and overseeing the management of British colonial government accounts in Qing China, Japan, Singapore, and other areas of influence. In an advertisement in the North-China Herald of 17 February 1876 the Hongkong and Shanghai Banking Corporation reported to have a paid-up capital of five million dollars and a reserved fund of one hundred thousand dollars while at the time it operated branches in eight different countries, while in China it had branches in Beijing, Tianjin, Shanghai, Hankou, Fuzhou, Yantai, and Xiamen.

The quantity of banknotes of the Hongkong and Shanghai Banking Corporation made the amounts produced by other foreign banking corporations in China at the time look minuscule by comparison. The Hongkong and Shanghai Banking Corporation produced the banknotes of the Hong Kong dollar during its colonial era.

The Shanghai branch of the Hongkong and Shanghai Banking Corporation was established only briefly after the bank opened its headquarters in the British colony of Hong Kong. The general manager of the Shanghai branch was a Scotsman named David MacLean who fulfilled his role between 1865 and 1873 and managed to convince the Chinese Imperial Maritime Customs to deposit all its incoming revenue with the Hongkong and Shanghai Banking Corporation, which proved to be a very profitable endeavour for the British bank. HSBC soon established new branches wherever the Imperial Maritime Customs had one of its local offices. Afterwards the Hongkong and Shanghai Banking Corporation would find itself branching out beyond customs as it would expand in the businesses of money deposits and lending money to the Chinese government, collecting war indemnities on behalf of the British government, financing the construction of railways, and lending money to the military of the Qing dynasty, which was fighting an expensive campaign against warlords in the north of China. The many branches of the bank issued their own banknotes, which due to the position and positive reputation of the Hongkong and Shanghai Banking Corporation were in great demand across China.

During the 19th century until the breakout of World War I the United Kingdom closely cooperated with the German Empire in China to balance out the expansionist influences of the French and Russian spheres of interest in China. As a result, the Hongkong and Shanghai Banking Corporation worked closely and very successfully with the Deutsch-Asiatische Bank. By the turn of the 20th century HSBC had become the most important foreign banking company in imperial China, leading to a great variety of banknotes being issued by the bank during this era. As the shareholders of the Hongkong and Shanghai Banking Corporation had only very limited liability for the banknotes emissed by the company, HSBC was required to hold ⅓ specie reserve in their vaults at any given time. These banknotes were thus always secured to be paid out to the bearer and never faced being defaulted.

The Hongkong and Shanghai Banking Corporation had effectively set the Shanghai foreign currency exchange rates, a fact which shows the extent of its sizable and growing dominant role in Chinese financial matters during the Qing dynasty and early Republican eras. The role of the Hongkong and Shanghai Banking Corporation as custodian of the official finds of the Chinese government would continue until this task was assumed by the Central Bank of China and responsibilities were handled by the Chinese themselves; this was done after the Chinese currency reform enacted in 1935.

== Banknotes produced by French banks ==
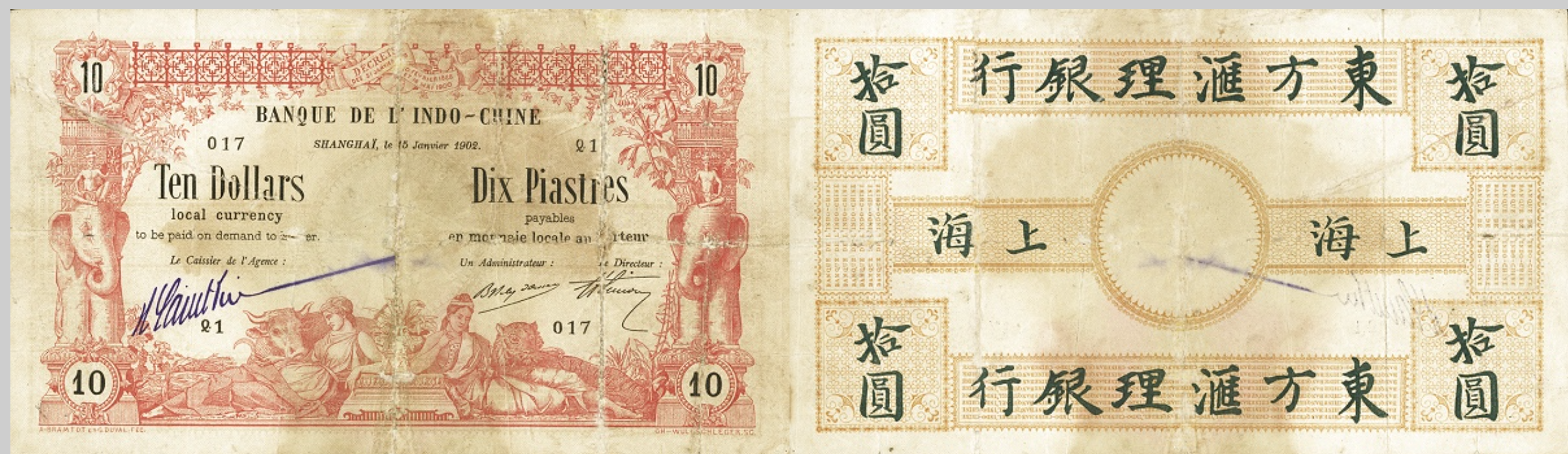
A trilingual banknote issued by the Banque de l'Indochine in French, English, and Mandarin Chinese.

Prior to the outbreak of the first world war, the French operated two banking corporations in China which were granted banknote issue rights by the Chinese government; these were the Banque de l'Indochine and the Banque Industrielle de Chine.

=== Banque de l'Indochine ===
The Banque de l'Indochine was created in 1875 to serve as the financial arm of France in Southeast Asia, and more particularly in French Indochina. After the turn of the century in 1900, the business interests of the Banque de l'Indochine were shifted from India to focus more on the Chinese market, particularly in southern China. In China the Banque de l'Indochine collected war indemnities for the Boxer Rebellion on behalf of the French government, where it served as the sole French representative in handling the Boxer indemnity. After the French sphere of influence established in China as southern China, the Banque de l'Indochine was tasked with taking over international trade between the French Republic and all of Qing China. In addition to its monopoly on issuing banknotes in French Indochina, the Banque de l'Indochine also circulated its banknotes in neighbouring Chinese provinces, most notably in the provinces of Yunnan and Guizhou. The Banque de l'Indochine was assigned a position of priority in the financing of the infrastructure of the French concession in Shanghai's International Settlement, where some of its notable accomplishments include the Shanghai Electric Power Company and the Shanghai Tramways.

The Banque de l'Indochine opened its first branch in China in 1899 in Shanghai and quickly opened more branches in Beijing, Hankou, Kunming, and Tianjin. All of these branches produced banknotes denominated in dollars for local circulation in China. At the Shanghai branch the French had made an attempt at issuing banknotes denominated in taels but this programme was almost immediately abandoned as non-remunerative. The banknotes produced by the Banque de l'Indochine were tri-lingual, printed in French, English, and Mandarin Chinese, making them the only foreign bank to employ three languages on their paper money in China. Denominations on banknotes produced by the Banque de l'Indochine were described in both French francs and Mexican piastres. These banknotes circulated in relatively small quantities in China until 1940, and consequently tend to be quite rare today.

== Banknotes produced by Japanese banks ==
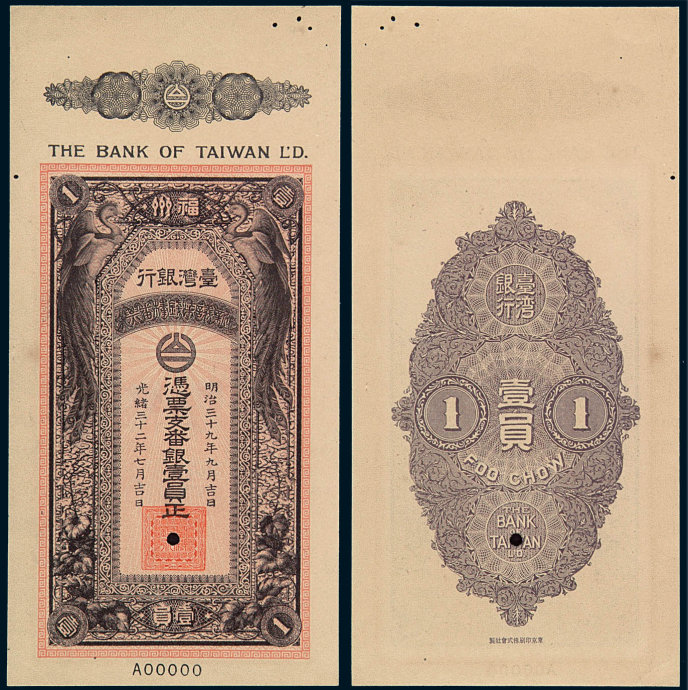
A specimen banknote of 1 yuan issued by the Fuzhou branch of the Bank of Taiwan in the year Guangxu 32 (1906).

=== Bank of Taiwan ===
After the First Sino-Japanese War ended, the Chinese were forced to give up the island of Taiwan to the Japanese as a part of the Treaty of Shimonoseki. Under Japanese rule the island was run as a colony and soon Japanese institutions were being established for the benefit of the Empire of Japan. In 1899 the Bank of Taiwan was established and had a starting capital of ¥ 5,000,000. The goals of the Bank of Taiwan were to provide capital for the export of Taiwanese raw materials to Japan proper and to expand Japanese trade with China through its branch offices in Mainland China. The first mainland Chinese branch of the Bank of Taiwan was opened in Shanghai where in 1905 it issued a series of banknotes denominated in silver dollars. The issuing of these paper notes also required permission from the imperial Japanese government. In 1906 a series of banknotes was issued consisting of the denominations 1 gold yen, 5 gold yen, 10 gold yen, 50 gold yen, and 100 gold yen.

The designs of the banknotes of the Bank of Taiwan were not uniform nor were their sizes; the designs of these banknotes seems to have been dictated by local Chinese customs. Some had a vertical design, such as the banknotes produced by the Xiamen (Amoy) and Shantou (Swatow) branches, while those produced at the Guangzhou (Canton), Hankou, Jiujiang, Shanghai, and Fuzhou branches were all horizontal, although the general shape of the banknotes and their design patterns also differ between branches.

An approximate 10% of all banknotes produced by the Japanese Bank of Taiwan were circulating on mainland China at any given time.

=== Yokohama Specie Bank ===
The only truly Japanese banking company to circulate its own banknotes in Qing dynasty era China was the Yokohama Specie Bank. The Yokohama Specie Bank was established in 1880 for the international trade Japan had recently been opened to. The bank primarily did business in discounting bills of exchange, handling in the Japanese foreign exchange market, and in promoting trade with the Chinese Empire. In 1893 the Yokohama Specie Bank opened an office in the Chinese trade port of Shanghai.

During the early years of the Yokohama Specie Bank, it survived an economic recession, after which it received loans from the imperial Japanese government and permission to issue its own paper notes. At first the bank used the silver standard to back the banknotes it put into circulation, but due to global depreciation of silver during the late 19th century, the Meiji period imperial Japanese government had turned to using the gold standard for its currency in 1897, using the war indemnity money due to them after the defeat of the Qing dynasty in the First Sino-Japanese War as backing for the new gold yen banknotes.

After the first Sino-Japanese and Russo-Japanese Wars, the Yokohama Specie Bank shifted its focus northwards to Manchuria where it first took over the grain trade from the Chinese and later the railroad activities from the Russians. Its branch offices tasked with producing banknotes in Manchuria were located at Dalian, Harbin, Yingkou (Niuzhuang), Jinan, Liaoyang, Mukden (Shenyang), and Tieling. These offices were initially established in support of Japanese military personnel stationed in Manchuria. Additional branches of the Yokohama Specie Bank in China were located in Beijing, Tianjin, Qingdao, Shanghai, and Hankou. Although the issues of paper money by the bank were small and managed in a good manner, the banknotes principally served the Japanese population in China and Manchuria, as the Chinese people rejected them due to resentments they harboured over Japanese encroachment in their country.

The 1903 silver yen notes produced by the Niuzhuang branch played an important role in financing local soy bean production in the region of Manchuria. By 1907 the Yokohama Specie Bank's paper notes enjoyed circulation throughout all of Manchuria. These banknotes were circulated by the branch in the port city of Dalian. Peak circulation of the bank's paper notes was reached in 1911 when a total of 7,200,000 dollars in banknotes were paid out.

Over its many years of operating in China, the Yokohama Specie Bank issued a large variety of paper notes. At different times it issued banknotes that were denominated in taels, dollars, silver yen, gold yen, big money, small money, local currency and even fractional small denominational sen notes. All banknotes produced by the bank were printed by the Printing Bureau of the Imperial Japanese Government.

Today all banknotes produced by the Yokohama Specie Bank during the late Qing dynasty period between 1902 and 1911 are rare and bring exceedingly high prices on the private collector's market, the sole exception being the 1 dollar banknote which was issued in 1902; this banknote occasionally becomes available to collectors. In general Yokohama Specie Bank varieties provide private collectors with a rather wide field from which they could build up a notaphilic collection. The problem many collectors of banknotes today face is that, due to tight management by the Japanese and a near total banknote redemption, very few of these paper notes remained unredeemed, making them relatively rare today.

== Banknotes produced by Russian banks ==
=== Russo-Chinese Bank ===
The Russo-Chinese Bank (華俄道勝銀行) was founded on 5 December 1895 in the Russian Embassy in Paris as a joint-venture, from Russian and French capital. Approximately a year after it was established the Russo-Chinese Bank received a contract from the government of the Qing dynasty for the construction of the Chinese Eastern Railway in the three provinces making up Manchuria. This venture into Manchurian railways proved to be so successful that by the end 1902, the Russo-Chinese Bank had achieved the status of being the second-largest foreign banking corporation in all of the Chinese Empire. The total of all British bank investments in 1902 (including the Hongkong and Shanghai Banking Corporation) added up to 33% of the investments from foreign banks into the Chinese economy, while the Russo-Chinese Bank by itself managed to account for as much as 31.3%. The different branches of the Russo-Chinese Bank each fulfilled different roles as the Beijing office was essentially exclusively engaged in political affairs with the imperial Chinese government, while the Shanghai office was mostly invested in the mercantile exchange business.

The Russo-Chinese bank enjoyed a large amount of prosperity from its Manchurian railroad charter which allowed the bank to issue two series of banknotes. In 1901 it issued banknotes denominated in Mexican dollars and a second series was issued in 1907, denominated in taels. After the Chinese Eastern Railway started opening for business, the Russo-Chinese Bank collected fares for both passengers and goods in Mexican pesos due to the former wide circulation of the Spanish silver dollar in Ming dynasty times through trade with the Philippines as part of the Spanish East Indies in the Spanish colonial empire that minted the silver coins from Mexico. However, after the railway was fully operational, the company preferred to exclusively handle fees in Russian rubles. As an effect of the Russo-Japanese War, the Russo-Chinese Bank lost a majority of its funds as it had invested heavily in the Russian military, leading it to merge with various other imperial Russian banking companies operating in China and the Banque du Nord in 1910, becoming the Russo-Asiatic Bank.

=== Russo-Asiatic Bank ===
The Russo-Asiatic Bank was created in 1910 out of a series of mergers of the Russo-Chinese Bank with other banks during a reorganisation. This change was fundamentally only a rename as all of its outstanding assets and its business, after the deduction of its war losses, remained completely intact. Under the Russo-Chinese Bank name the bank never enjoyed a large paper note circulation. The bank's final balance sheet, published by the bank's St. Petersburg headquarters, attests to this: the number of banknotes remaining in circulation, outstanding, and unredeemed total only 146,177 banknotes in dollars and 13,766 banknotes in taels. Banknotes that still had the old name of the bank (Russo-Chinese Bank) in circulation had the name crossed out by hand by employees of the bank. After the Bolsheviks took Russia by revolution in 1918, they nationalised all of the Russo-Asiatic Bank's properties in the country partially because the bank had supported the White Russians against the Bolshevik state. After this the bank moved its headquarters to Paris where it would go bankrupt in 1926 after losing £5,000,000 while speculating in foreign currency at the Paris financial markets. The Paris branch office then sent out a notification to the Shanghai branch office to close the doors of the establishment, forever ending the Russo-Asiatic Bank's operations in China.

Banknotes produced by the East Turkestan branches of the Russo-Asiatic Bank (Kashgar, Yining, and Changuchak) during the Republican period circulating between 1913 and 1924 still prominently depicted imperial Chinese symbols such as the five-fingered dragon on both sides. They were distinguished from banknotes produced by other foreign banking corporations because they were denominated in fixed weights of pure gold, rather than specific monetary units. The banknotes from this era were printed by Bradbury Wilkinson and Company in London, United Kingdom.

== Deutsch-Asiatische Bank ==
The Deutsch-Asiatische Bank (DAB) was created on 15 May 1889 and was notable for being the first major non-British foreign banking corporation in China during the Qing dynasty period, and for being the only German bank with the right to issue its own notes in China. The main priority for the Deutsch-Asiatische Bank was to finance imperials loans requested by the Qing government with a special focus on both railways and mining operations within the sphere of interest held by the German Empire in the province of Shandong. The initial capital the Deutsch-Asiatische Bank paid to the government of the Qing dynasty numbered 5,000,000 taels, a number which would steadily increase as time went by. In 1896 the Deutsch-Asiatische Bank entered into a cooperation with the Hongkong and Shanghai Banking Corporation (HSBC) to underwrite Chinese government loans aggregating £32,000,000. The money for these government loans was secured by collecting the revenue of the Imperial Maritime Customs and taxes collected on Chinese salt. The project, which cost 54,000,000 gold mark, led to the construction of 255 miles (410 km) of railways from the city of Qingdao, German Kiautschou to Jinan. Additionally it paid 12,000,000 gold mark for the establishment of new mining operations in Shandong. The bank was later also involved with British, French and Russian interests to build railways outside of the German sphere of interest. The banknotes issued by the Deutsch-Asiatische Bank were denominated in silver taels and silver dollars. The paper money that the bank was allowed to bring into circulation was tightly controlled by the German imperial government in Berlin and it was always in small quantities. The initial emission of banknotes occurred in 1907 and was strictly controlled by the German government, well managed, and in great demand. The second issue occurred during the Republic of China in 1914 after the banknotes arrived shortly before the Japanese invasion during World War I. Because of the war, only a small number of banknotes actually entered circulation. Although the banknotes of the DAB had no printer's imprint on them, it was generally believed that they were produced in the Leipzig plant of the German printing company Giesecke+Devrient. All banknotes produced by this bank depict the German national personification Germania alongside the imperial German eagle and a Chinese dragon prominently displayed on them.

After the outbreak of World War I, the Deutsch-Asiatische Bank was forced to suspend its operations in China. At the time that it had to cease operating in China, an amount of 2,595,968 taels worth of banknotes was circulating. In 1917 the Chinese republican government revoked the bank's privilege to produce its own paper notes for the Chinese market.

== International Banking Corporation ==
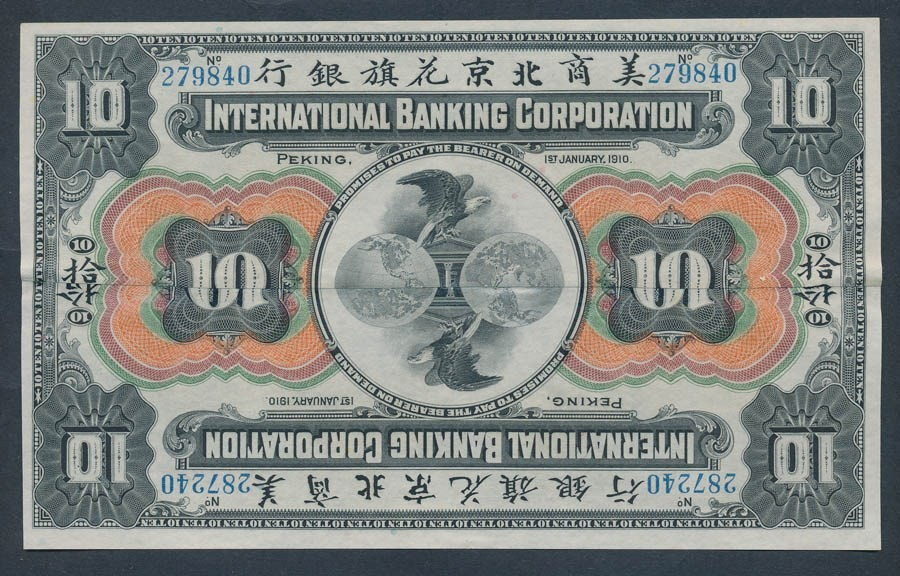
A rejoined banknote of 10 dollars issued by the International Banking Corporation, note that the serial numbers on the top and bottom don't match.

The sole American bank to operate in imperial China was the New York City-based International Banking Corporation, which was founded on 1 December 1901 for the purpose of promoting foreign trade with the United States in China and had two series of banknotes issued during both the Qing dynasty and early Republican periods. As the flag of the United States flew over the bank's several branch offices in China, the Chinese people began referring to the red, white, and blue coloured standard as hua-qi (花旗, 'colourful flag'), and it was not long before the International Banking Corporation itself was referred to as Huaqi Yinhang (花旗銀行, 'colourful flag bank') by the people of China.

American banking companies did not do business in the Chinese banking field until the very beginning of the 20th century. With none of their own banks in imperial China, all trade remittances of the United States had to go through British banks operating in the country. American Secretary of State John Hay advocated for the Americans to get involved in the Chinese market and obtain a share of it. As the United States had joined the eight-power alliance to put down the Boxer Rebellion in 1900, Americans felt it only right that they also participate in their share of the Boxer indemnities awarded to foreign powers in China. The first branch office of the International Banking Corporation in China was opened in Shanghai in 1902. In addition to dealing with the Boxer indemnities, the bank was active in granting loans to the government of the Qing dynasty, the largest of these loans being the Huguang Railway loan of 1911. In 1915 the National City Bank of New York had acquired a majority of shares in the International Banking Corporation. On 1 January 1927 the International Banking Corporation was to be entirely superseded by the National City Bank of New York, which took over all branch offices and would continue to operate them under its own brand name.

The banknotes issued by the International Banking Corporation were denominated in local currency and were released in denominations of 1 dollar, 5 dollars, 10 dollars, 50 dollars, and 100 dollars in the year 1907. All banknotes featured a pair of globes depicting both the Eastern Hemisphere and Western Hemisphere, an American eagle, and the scales of Justice. In the first year of its business the International Banking Corporation issued banknotes into circulation worth 202,474 dollars, later increasing this amount to 477,760 at the end of the Qing dynasty period by 1912. During the early Republican era a series of banknotes was released in 1918 which were denominated in taels.

The old paper notes issued by the International Banking Corporation were very popular in China and in great demand, and were always redeemed by the bank without being discounted as was very common for other institutions. When called in, the banknotes were canceled by the bank by cutting them in half. Many banknotes of the International Banking Corporation today found in collections were altered by gluing the two halves together and tend to bear mismatched serial numbers as a result; these banknotes are worth very little when compared to unaltered specimens found today.

== Netherlands Trading Society ==
The Netherlands Trading Society (Dutch: Nederlandsche Handel-Maatschappij or NHM) created its first branch office in China in 1903 on the Bund in the port city of Shanghai. In comparison with other foreign banking corporations operating in China, the Netherlands Trading Society was not a large banking company. However, the bank handled a large variety of different trade businesses with the Chinese. While the Netherlands Trading Society's presence in China was small or served as a training base for the future generation of Chinese bankers, many of these native businessmen later went on to form their own private banking companies during the Qing and Republican eras.

The number of banknotes produced by the Netherlands Trading Society in circulation in China was at all times relatively small in quantity because Dutch law had a substantial requirement for reserves to be held to back up the paper money issued that went into circulation. In 1909 the Netherlands Trading Society issued banknotes with the denominations 1 dollar, 5 dollars, and 10 dollars, and later under the Republic of China government in 1922 banknotes with denominations of 100 dollars and 500 dollars were issued. All banknotes issued by the Netherlands Trading Society in China had a principal vignette that depicted a Chinese warrior bearing a sword, clad in Chinese armour, and an ancient stone bridge.

== Currency units used on paper money during the late Qing period ==
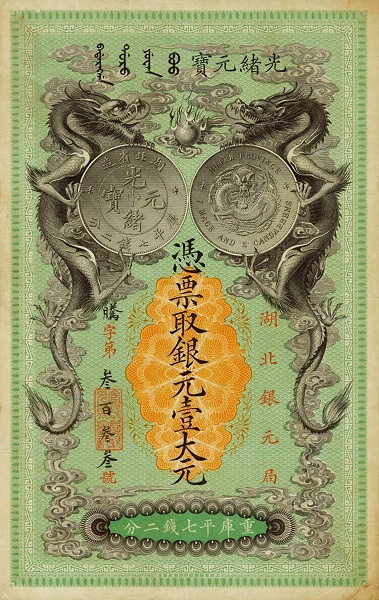
A banknote of 1 dayuan or 7 mace and 2 candareens issued by the Hupeh Government Mint in 1899; note that this banknote depicts the coin it was worth.

The denominations of the contemporary coinage were chaotic with different standards being used across regions, making it confusing to exchange between areas due to the wide range of systems and denominations used to categorise the many coinages of the Qing. There was likewise a wide range of types of paper notes. The traditional copper-allow cash was reflected in cash notes (錢票). Some of these banknotes used the traditional government-mandated exchange rate of 1,000 wén per string of cash coins (串 or 吊) in a system for cash coins known as Xiaoping Qian (小平錢), while others used differing local exchange rates, like the Eastern cash or Dongqian (東錢) of the Fengtian province, with 160 cash coins per string, or the metropolitan cash (京錢) from Beijing, which had an exchange rate of 500 cash coins per string. Local banknotes usually reflected local exchange rates. During the late Qing dynasty Japanese cash coins circulated in China, as well as cash coins from earlier dynasties of different shapes and sizes at different exchange rates.

On the local markets, the exchange rates even deviated from the fixed denominations, as had been the case with cash coins of substandard quality for an extended amount of time. The silver currency was reflected in silver notes (銀票), and also in other types of paper money there were great differences in the conversion rate depending on the region where the banknotes were traded or used in. In Beijing, the imperial Kuping tael (庫平兩), which had a standard weight of 37.5 grams, the exchange rate was used side by side with the local metropolitan rate which was known as the Jingping liang (京平兩), while the Shanghai tael (上海紋銀) was used on banknotes issued by both the Huifeng Bank (匯豐銀行) and the Shanghai Tongshang Yinhang (上海通商銀行). The banknotes of the Hongkong and Shanghai Banking Corporation were principally denominated in Chinese dollars; however, the tael, Mexican dollar, and various currencies based upon the local Chinese dollar were also employed as denominations.

The denominations on the silver yuan banknotes (銀元票) were the most standardised, but exchange rates still differed on the individual Chinese markets where they circulated, depending on the local value of the silver yuan coins. The imperial government attempted to clarify this chaotic situation with the Statutes for Paper Bills (通用銀錢票章程) decreed in the year 1909. For silver currencies the standardised government currency units were 1 Kuping tael (庫平兩) = 10 mace (錢) = 100 candareen (分) = 1000 cash (厘 / 釐) for taels, which were based on units of weight, while the round silver coins were standardised at 1 yuan or dollar (元 / 圓) = 10 jiao or hou (角 / 毫) = 100 fen or sin (分 / 仙) = 1000 cash (厘 / 文), and 1 yuan was worth a coin with a weight of 0.72 taels as standardized in 1910.

== Denominations on banknotes of foreign banks in Qing China ==
List of note issuing foreign banks in imperial and early republican China:

Foreign bank	Country of origin	Branche(s) in China (or Hong Kong or Macau)	Date(s) of issue	Denominations
Agra and United Services Bank	United Kingdom	Hong Kong	1862	100 dollars, 200 dollars, 300 dollars, 500 dollars
Asiatic Banking Corporation	United Kingdom	Shanghai	18xx	10 taels, 25 taels
Chartered Mercantile Bank of India, London and China	United Kingdom	Hankou, Hong Kong, Shanghai	18xx, 1881	5 taels, 10 taels, 25 taels, 50 taels, 100 taels, 1000 taels, 1 Mexican dollar, 5 Mexican dollars, 10 Mexican dollars, 50 Mexican dollars
Chartered Bank of India, Australia and China	United Kingdom	Hankou, Hong Kong, Shanghai, Tianjin	18xx, 1881, 1898–1911, 19xx, 19xx, 1863–1930	5 taels, 10 taels, 25 taels, 50 taels, 100 taels, 1 Mexican dollar, 5 Mexican dollars, 10 Mexican dollars, 50 Mexican dollars, 1 Mexican dollar, 5 Mexican dollars, 10 Mexican dollars, 50 Mexican dollars, 100 Mexican dollars, 100 taels, 500 taels, 5 Hongping taels, 10 Hongping taels, 1 dollar, 5 dollars, 10 dollars, 25 dollars, 50 dollars, 100 dollars, 500 dollars
Comptoir d'Escompte de Paris	France	Shanghai	1866	5 taels
Bank of Hindustan, China and Japan	United Kingdom	Hong Kong	1863	Unknown denominations
Hong Kong and Shanghai Banking Corporation (HSBC)	United Kingdom	Xiamen (Amoy), Yantai (Chefoo), Fuzhou, Hankou, Hong Kong, Beijing, Shanghai, Tianjin	18xx, 1894–1897, 1874–1899, 1884–1923	1 taels, 5 taels, 10 taels, 1 Mexican dollars, 25 Mexican dollars, 50 Mexican dollars, 100 Mexican dollars, 1 tael, 5 taels, 10 taels, 50 taels, 100 taels, 1 dollar, 5 dollars, 10 dollars, 25 dollars, 50 dollars, 100 dollars
National Bank of China	United Kingdom	Xiamen (Amoy), Hong Kong	1892–1911	5 dollars, 10 dollars, 50 dollars, 100 dollars, 500 dollars
Oriental Bank Corporation	United Kingdom	Hong Kong, Shanghai, Victoria	1865, 1866–1883	5 taels, 10 taels, 50 taels, 100 taels, 500 taels, 5 dollars, 25 dollars, 50 dollars, 100 dollars
Russo-Chinese Bank	Russia	Hankou, Yingkou (Niuzhuang), Beijing, Shanghai, Tianjin	1898, 1898–1907, 1903–1914, 1901–1909	100 cash, 300 cash, 1 tael, 3 taels, 5 taels, 10 taels, 50 taels, 100 taels, 500 taels, 1 dollars, 5 dollars, 10 dollars, 50 dollars, 1 Mexican dollar, 5 Mexican dollars, 10 Mexican dollars, 50 Mexican dollars, 100 Mexican dollars
Russo-Asiatic Bank	Russia	Harbin, Yining (Kuld'sha), Changuchak, Kashgar, Yingkou (Niuzhuang), Beijing, Shanghai, Tianjin	1910–1917, 1917, 1913–1924, 1914, 1917	1 dollar, 5 dollars, 10 dollars, 50 dollars, 100 dollars, 500 dollars, 50 kopeks, 1 rouble, 3 roubles, 10 roubles, 100 roubles, 1 gold fen, (Note: These banknotes were denominated in fixed weights of pure gold, rather than specific monetary units.) 2 gold fen, 10 gold fen, 50 gold fen, 100 gold fen, 1 Mexican dollar, 5 Mexican dollars, 10 Mexican dollars, 50 Mexican dollars, 100 Mexican dollars, 500 roubles, 1000 roubles
Sino-Belgian Bank (Banque Sino-Belge)	Belgium	Hankou, Shanghai, Tianjin	1902–1912, 1908–1912	1 dollar, 5 dollars, 10 dollars, 50 dollars, 5 Mexican dollars, 10 Mexican dollars
Banque Belge pour l'Étranger (Banque Sino-Belge)	Belgium	Hankou, Beijing, Shanghai, Tianjin	1912, 1913	1 dollar/piastre, 5 dollars/piastres, 10 dollars/piastres, 50 dollars/piastres, 100 dollars/piastres, 5 Mexican dollars
British and Belgian Industrial Bank of China	United Kingdom, Belgium	Changsha	1912	5 taels, 10 taels
Deutsch-Asiatische Bank	Germany	Hankou, Beijing, Shanghai, Tianjin, Qingdao (Kiautschou Bay concession)	1907, 1907, 1914, 1914	1 tael, 5 taels, 10 taels, 20 taels, 1 dollar, 5 dollars, 10 dollars, 25 dollars, 50 dollars, 100 dollars, 200 dollars, 50 taels, 100 taels, 500 taels
International Banking Corporation	United States	Guangzhou (Canton), Hankou, Harbin, Beijing, Shanghai, Tianjin	1909–1919, 1918	1 dollar, 5 dollars, 10 dollars, 50 dollars, 100 dollars, 1 tael, 5 taels, 10 taels, 50 taels, 100 taels
Banque de l'Indochine	France	Guangzhou (Canton), Shamian, Shanghai	1901–1902	1 dollars/piastres, 5 dollars/piastres, 10 dollars/piastres, 100 dollars/piastres
Banco Nacional Ultramarino	Portugal	Macau	1905–1942, 1920–1942	1 pataca, 5 patacas, 10 patacas, 25 patacas, 50 patacas, 100 patacas, 1 avo, 5 avos, 10 avos, 20 avos, 50 avos
Netherlands Trading Society	The Netherlands	Shanghai	1909, 1922	1 dollar, 5 dollars, 10 dollars, 50 dollars, 100 dollars
Bank of Taiwan, Ltd.	Japan	Xiamen (Amoy), Guangzhou (Canton), Fuzhou, Hankou, Jiujiang, Shanghai, Shantou (Swatow)	1905–1911, 1906–1921, 1911–1917	1 silver yen, 5 silver yen, 10 silver yen, 50 silver yen, 1 gold yen, 5 gold yen, 10 gold yen, 50 gold yen, 1 dollar, 5 dollars, 10 dollars, 50 dollars
Yokohama Specie Bank, Ltd.	Japan	Dalian, Hankou, Harbin, Yingkou (Niuzhuang), Beijing, Shanghai, Tianjin, Jinan	1902, 1913–1917, 1918, 1902–1937	5 taels, 10 taels, 50 taels, 100 taels, 1 gold yen, 5 gold yen, 10 gold yen, 100 gold yen, 10 sen, 50 sen, 1 dollar, 5 dollars, 10 dollars, 50 dollars, 100 dollars

== Banknotes as a percentage of the Chinese money stock during the late Qing dynasty ==
Chinese historian Peng Xinwei stated that in 1900, privately produced banknotes made up only 3% of the total volume of Chinese currency stock. This number would (according to Niv Horesh) be unlikely to surpass 6% if banknotes denominated in silver currencies were taken into account (these banknotes were produced by government banks and modern banking corporations). Foreign banks operating in China generally did not disclose the volume of banknotes issued by them circulating in China proper; the fact that they did not openly disclose this resulted in inflated estimates thereof over the years. For this reason Horesh states that it would be very implausible to assume that the ratio of all banknotes as part of the entirety of the Chinese money stock was any significant number higher than 10% even as late as 1900.

Meanwhile, during this same period the traditional cast copper-alloy cash coins made up only 17.78% of the total Chinese currency stock; the percentage representing cash coins would only decrease from this point onwards. Meanwhile, Peng estimated that foreign trade dollars circulating in China (which mostly included the silver Mexican dollar) made up 25% of the total Chinese currency stock by the 1900s. The Mexican or Spanish silver dollar had been in wide circulation since Ming dynasty times, due to past Maritime Silk Road trade with the Philippines as part of the Spanish East Indies in the Spanish colonial empire that minted the silver coins from Mexico or Bolivia or Peru and flowed through the Manila-Acapulco Galleon Trade. This trend was actually the opposite in the Western world and Japan where the global introduction of government steam-minted coinages halted the spread of Mexican-mined silver pesos. This effect was most notable in North and South America as well as the Philippines. At the same time silver was being diffused from the gold standard and there were major discoveries of large silver deposits in the United States and West Africa.

== Gallery ==
Gallery
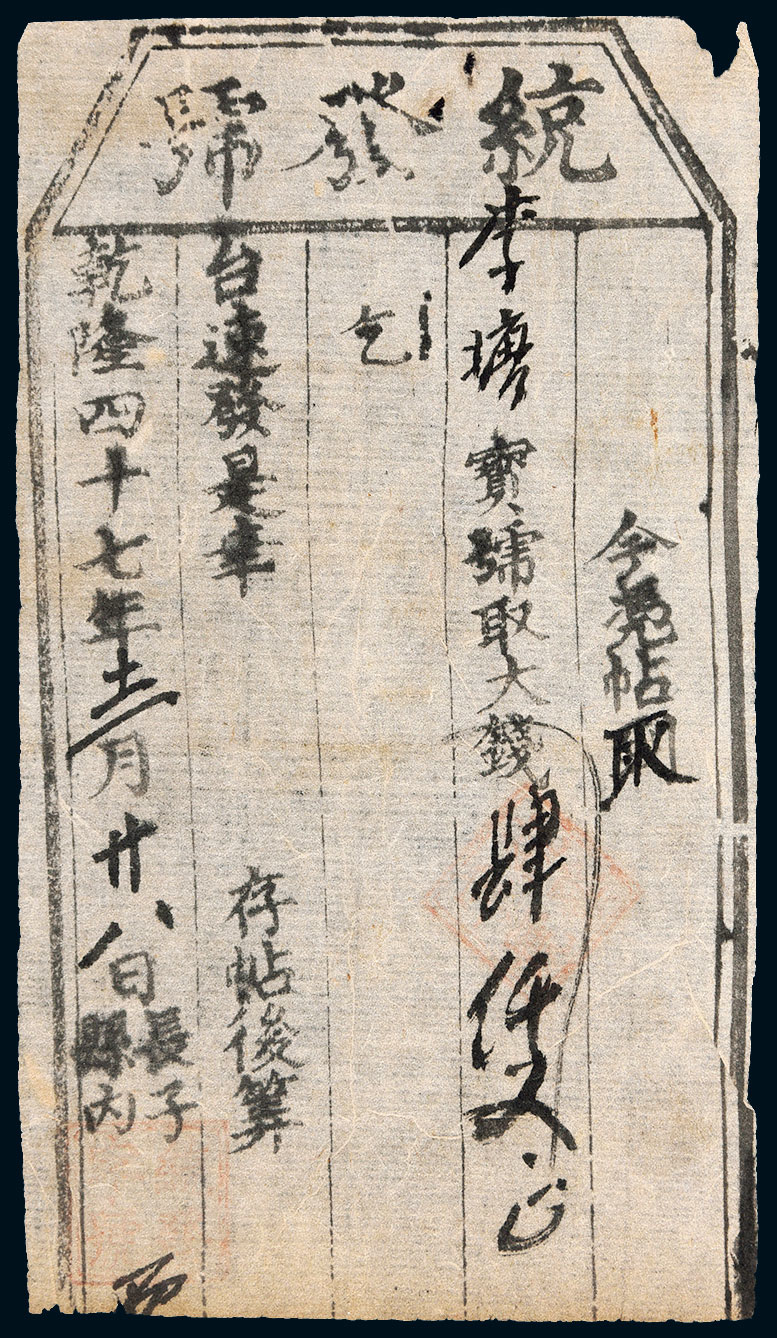
A banknote of 1000 wén issued by the Tongfa Money Shop in the year Qianlong 47 (1782).

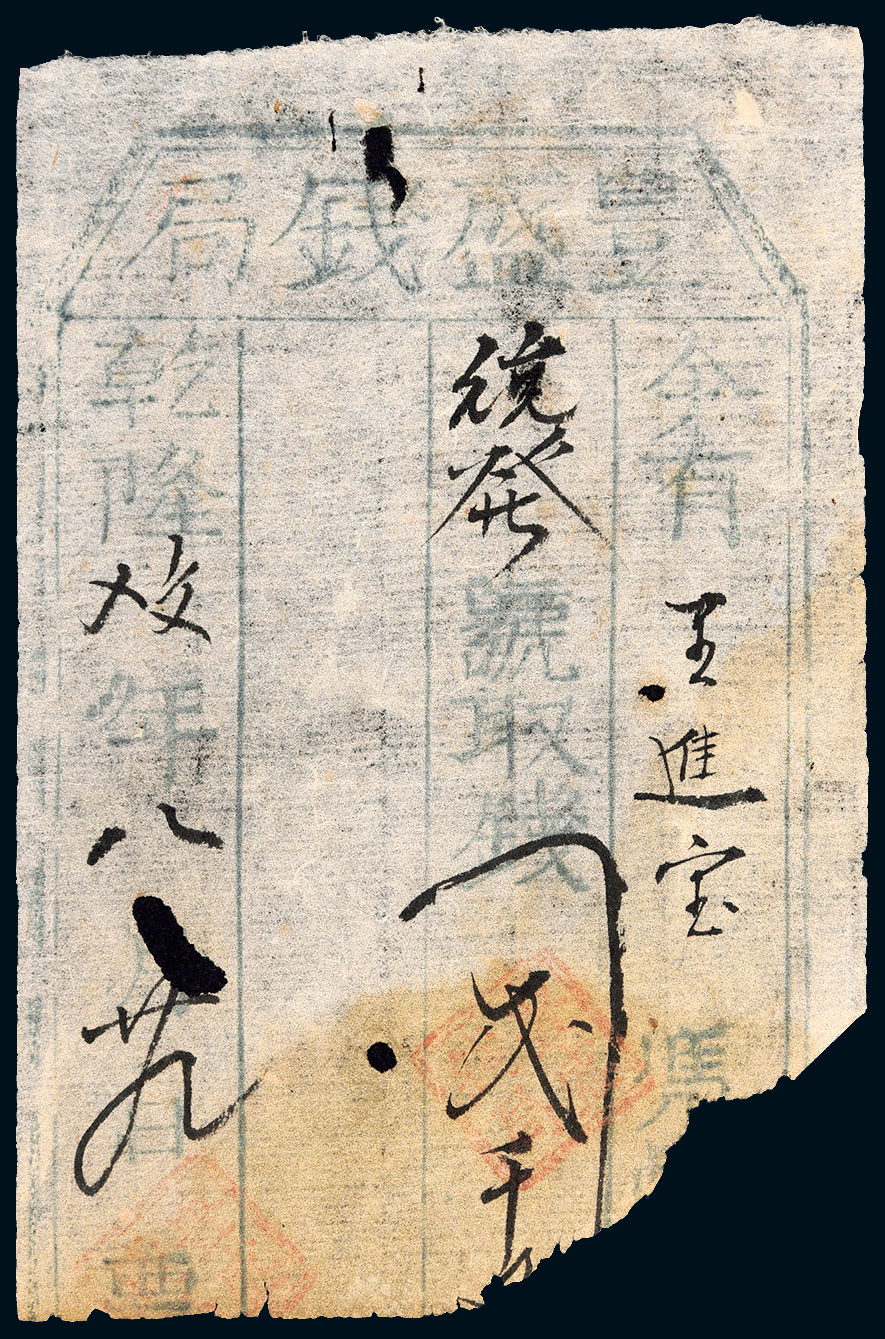
A banknote of 2000 wén issued by the Fengsheng Money Shop in the year Qianlong 49 (1784).

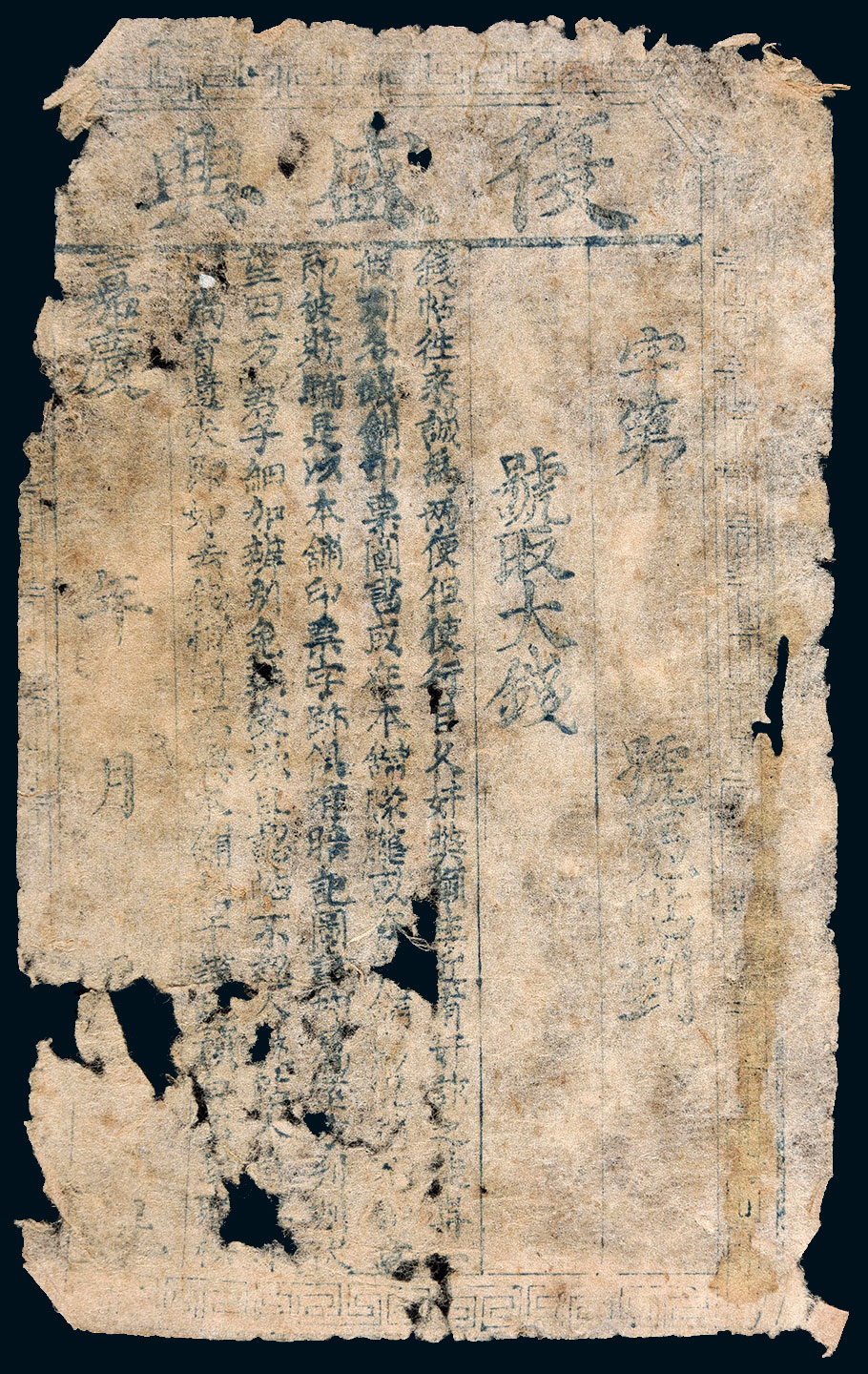
A blank and undated banknote from the Qianlong era.

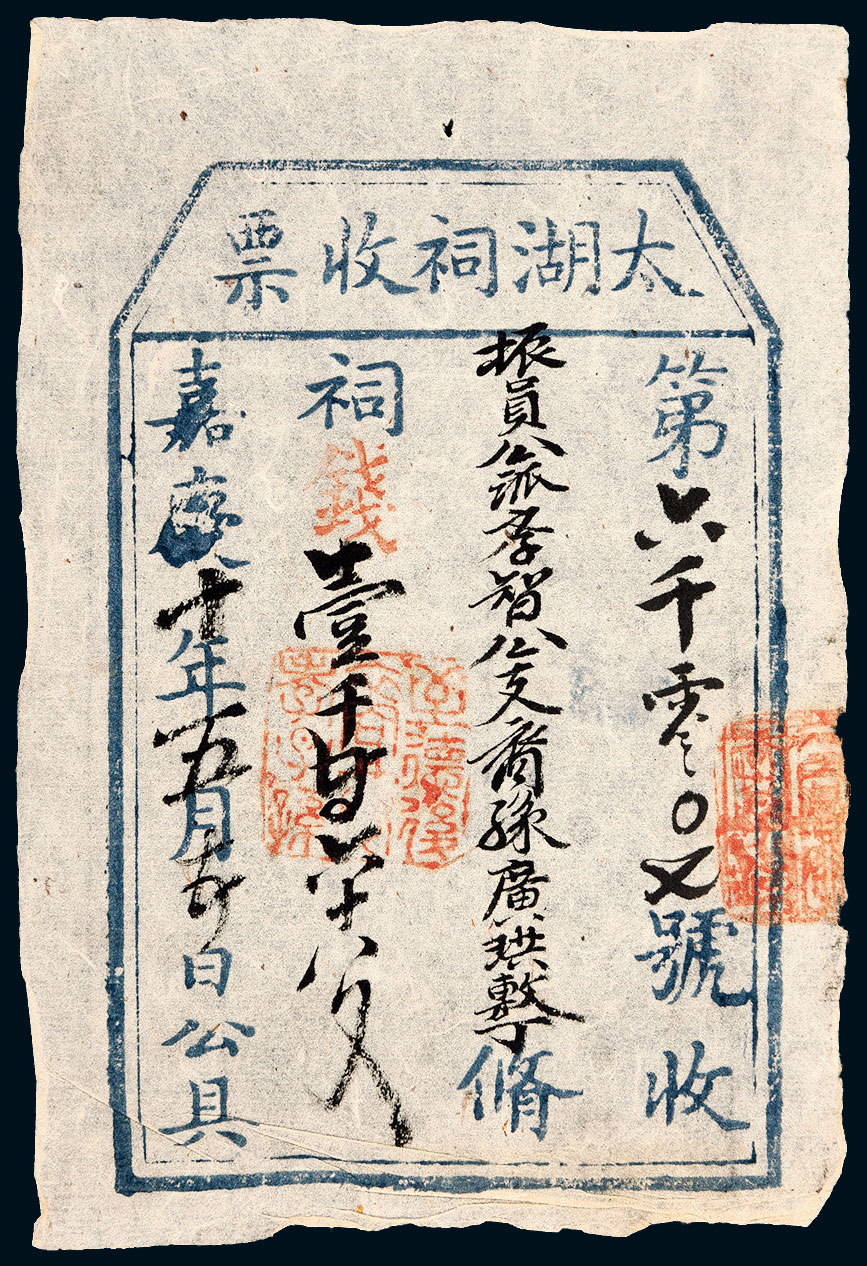
A Zhuangpiao banknote of 1068 wén issued by the Lake Tai ancestral temple in the year Jiaqing 10 (1805).

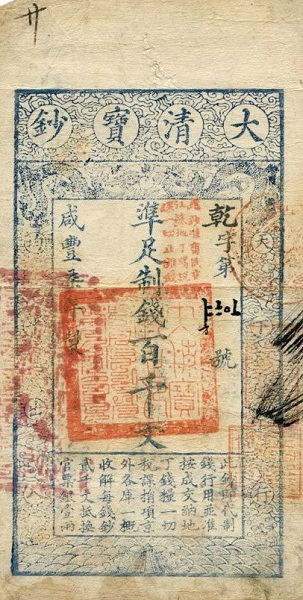
A Great Qing Treasure Note (大清寶鈔) banknote of 100.000 wén issued in 1857.

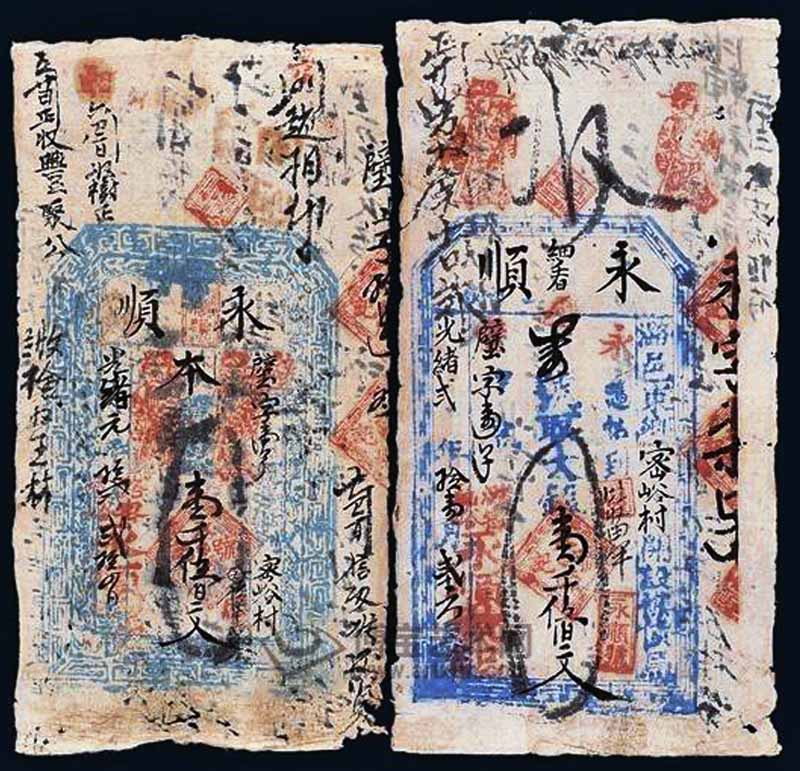
Banknotes from 1875.

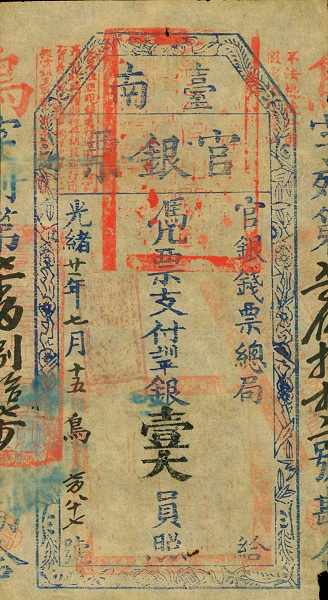
A Taiwanese banknote of 1 dollar issued in Tainan.

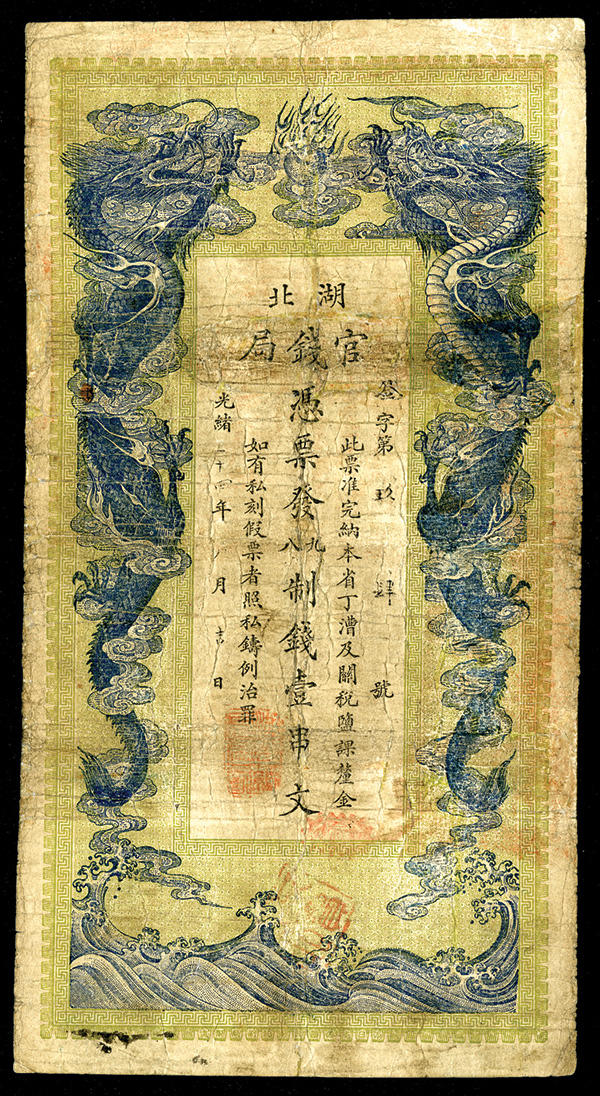
A banknote of 1 chuàn wén (串文, 'string of cash coins') issued by the Hupeh Provincial Bank in 1899.

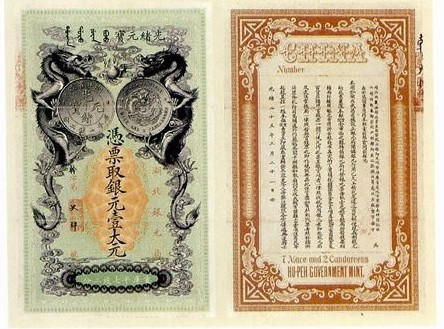
A banknote of 7 mace and 2 candareens issued by the Hupeh Government Mint.

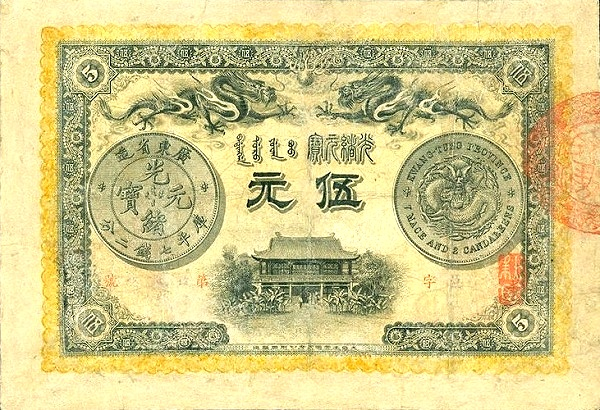
A banknote of 5 dollars issued by the province of Guangdong in 1905.

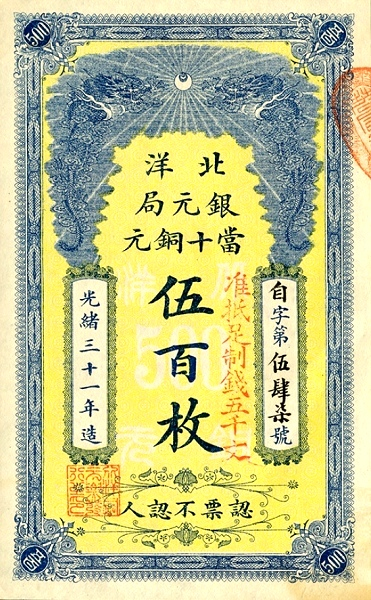
A banknote of 500 copper coins issued by the Pei Yang Currency Bureau in 1905.

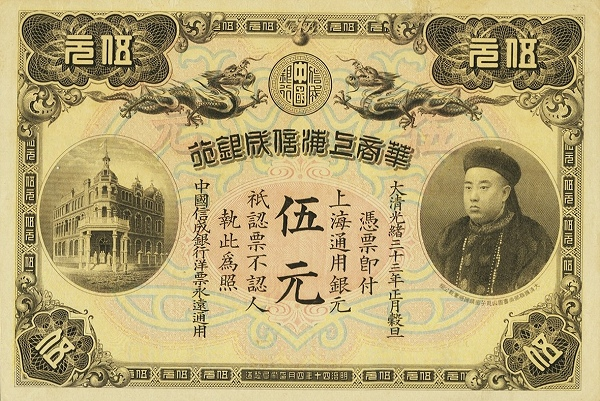
A banknote of 5 dollars issued by the Sin Chun Bank of China in 1907.

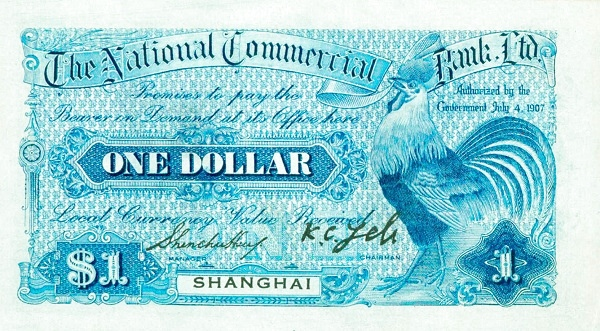
A 5 dollar banknote issued by the Shanghai branch of The National Commercial Bank in 1907.

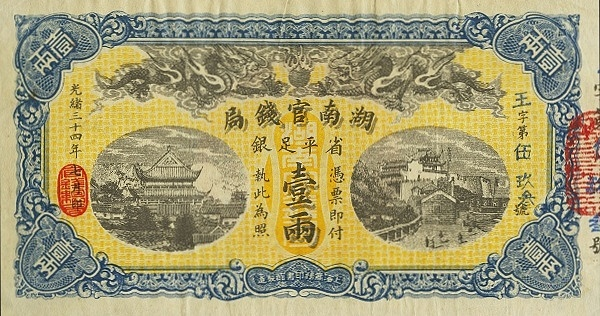
A 1 tael banknote issued by the Hunan Government Bank in 1908.

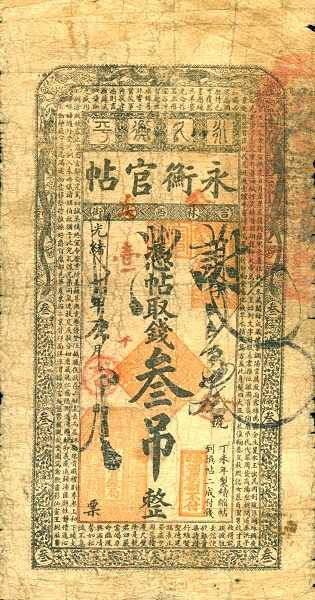
A 3 tiao banknote issued by the Kirin branch of the Yung Heng Provincial Bank in 1908.

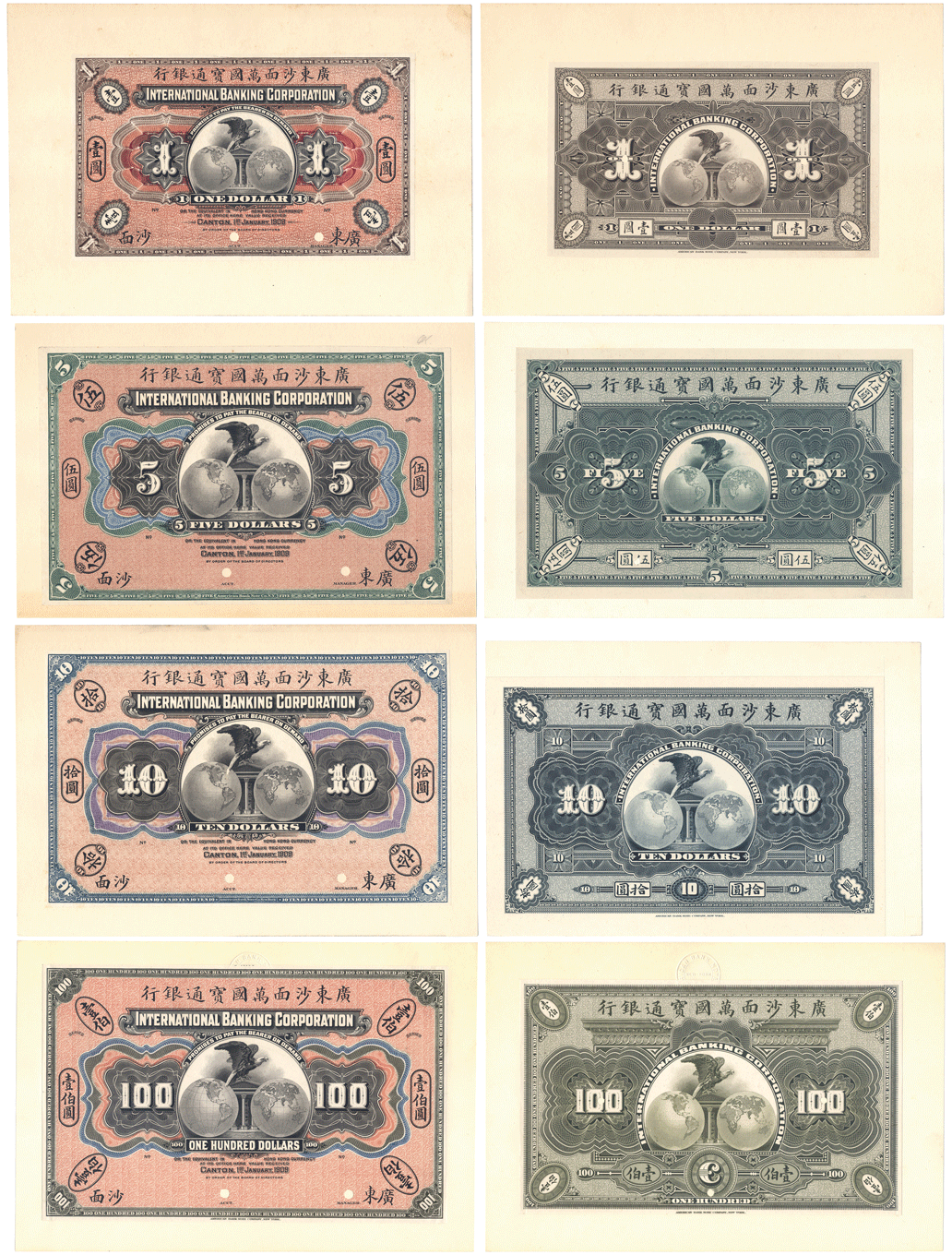
Banknotes issued by the International Banking Corporation in 1909 for circulation in Guangdong.

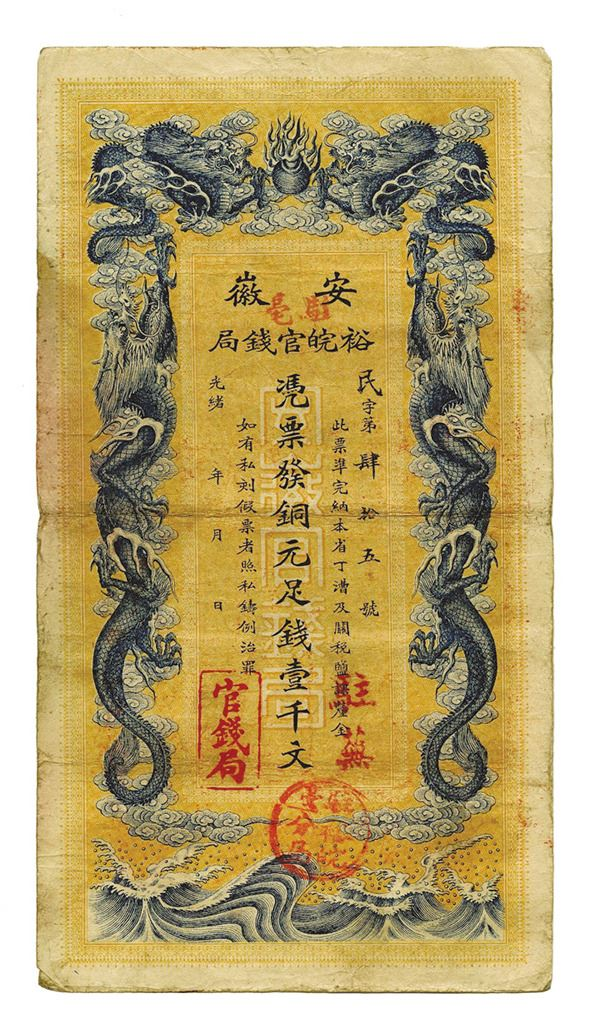
A 1000 wén banknote issued by the Anhwei Yu Huan Bank in 1909.

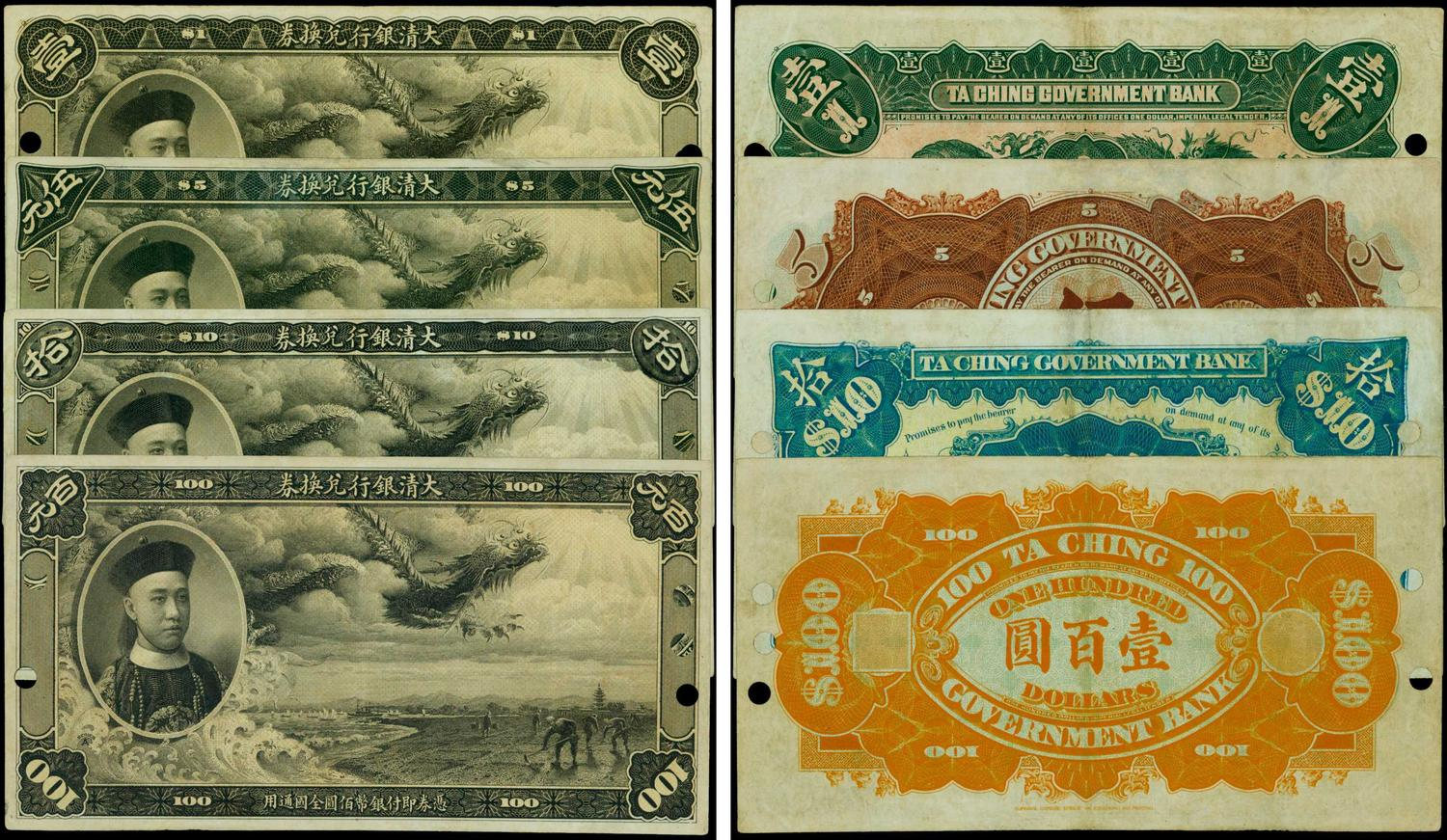
Banknotes issued by the Da-Qing Bank depicting Zaifeng, Prince Chun issued in 1910.

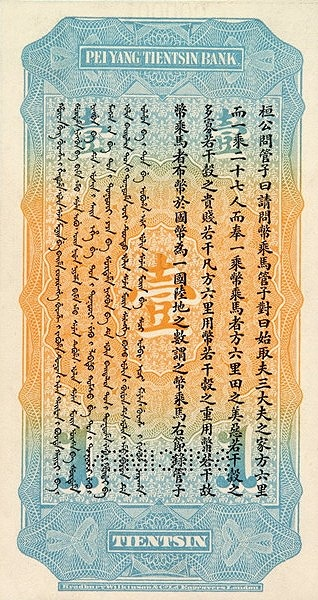
The reverse of a 1 tael banknote issued by the Pei Yang Tientsin Bank in 1910.

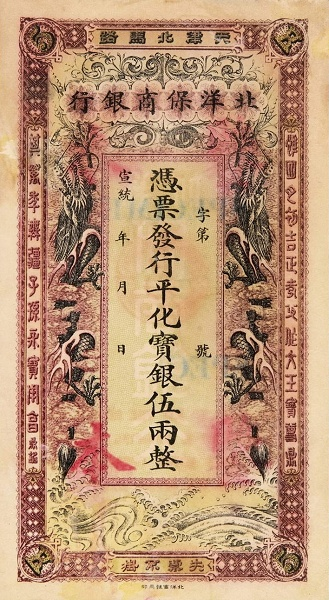
A 5 tael banknote issued by the Commercial Guarantee Bank of Chihli in 1912.

== See also ==
- Economy of the Qing dynasty
- Economic history of China before 1912
- History of banking in China
- Manchukuo yuan

== Sources ==
- Dai Zhiqiang (戴志強), ed. (2008). Zhongguo qianbi shoucang jianshang quanji (中國錢幣收藏鑒賞全集) (Changchun: Jilin chuban jituan). (in Mandarin Chinese).
- Feuerwerker, A. (1958) China's early industrialization: sheng Hsuan-huai (1844–1916) and the mandarin enterprise. Publisher: Harvard University Press, Cambridge, Massachusetts.
- Gabrisch, Karl (1990). Geld aus Tibet: Sammlung Dr. Karl Gabrisch; Ausstellung des Münzkabinetts der Stadt Winterthur (Winterthur: Departement für Kulturelles; Rikon: Tibet-Institut). (in German).
- Helleiner, E. (2003). The making of National Money: territorial currencies in historical perspective. Ithaca, New York: Cornell University Press.
- Huang Jianhui (1994). Zhongguo yinhangyeshi 中國銀行業史 (in Chinese). Taiyuan: Shanxi jingji chubanshe.
- King, Frank H. H. (1965). Money and Monetary Policy in China, 1845-1895. Harvard University Press. ISBN 978-0-674-49828-0.
- McElderry, A.L. (1976). Shanghai old-style banks (Ch'ien- Chuang), 1800–1925: a traditional institution in a changing society. Ann Arbor, Michigan: Center for Chinese Studies, University of Michigan.
- Meng Pengxing (孟彭興) (1998). "Cong feiqian dao jiaozi huizi (從"飛錢"到"交子"、"會子"), in Zhang Dainian (張岱年), ed. Zhongguo wenshi baike (中國文史百科) (Hangzhou: Zhejiang renmin chubanshe), Vol. 1, 414. (in Mandarin Chinese).
- Pan Liangui (2004). Shanghai huobishi 上海貨幣史 (in Chinese). Shanghai: Shanghai renminchubanshe.
- Peng, Xinwei (1988) [1954]. Zhongguo huobi shi 中国货币史 [A Monetary History of China]. Shanghai: Shanghai renmin chubanshe. The book has been translated into English by Edward 11. Kaplan as A Monetary History of China (Bellingham, WA: Western Washington, 1994).
- Peng Xinwei (彭信威) (1994) A monetary history of China (translated by Edward H. Kaplan). Western Washington University (Bellingham, Washington).
- Xie Tianyu (謝天宇), ed. (2005). Zhongguo qianbi shoucang yu jianshang quanshu (中國錢幣收藏與鑒賞全書) (Tianjin: Tianjin guji chubanshe), Vol. 2, 508. (in Mandarin Chinese).
- Zhou Fazeng (周發增), Chen Longtao (陳隆濤), Qi Jixiang (齊吉祥), ed. (1998). Zhongguo gudai zhengzhi zhidu shi cidian (中國古代政治制度史辭典) (Beijing: Shoudu shifan daxue chubanshe), Pages 372, 375, 380, 381, 382. (in Mandarin Chinese).
