= Imperial Bank of China =

Central Bank of Qing China

The Imperial Bank of China
- Native name: 中國通商銀行
- Type: Private
- Founded: 1897
- Defunct: 1952

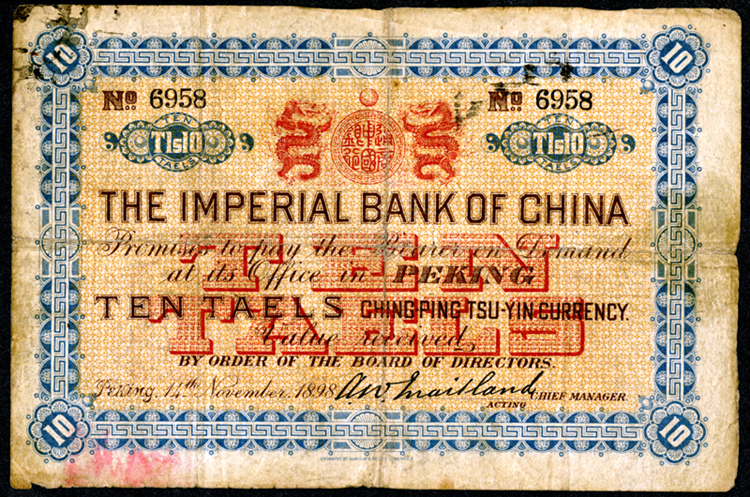
Imperial Bank of China, 1898 Peking branch Taels issue banknote from the Pogrebetsky collection.

The Imperial Bank of China (Traditional Chinese: 中國通商銀行, Simplified Chinese: 中国通商银行) was the first Chinese-owned bank modelled on Western banks and banking practices. It was founded in Shanghai by Mr. Sheng Xuanhuai in 1897 successfully operating until 1913 when it was renamed to the Commercial Bank of China. The "rebranding" was for political reasons following the overthrow of the last emperor Pu Yi by the Nationalists in 1911.

The manager, Andrew Wright Maitland (1850–1906), was hired out of retirement from The Hongkong and Shanghai Banking Corporation. Ambitions for the bank were high, and it was proposed that it takeover the issuance of banknote throughout China. Maitland's signature - A.W. Maitland - appears on the banknotes. Although offices were opened in Canton (Guangzhou) and Beijing (then Peking) the Imperial Bank of China never received the full support of central government and it became marginalised.

The bank was closed down in 1952 after being taken over by the Central Government of the People's Republic of China.

== History ==
Imperial Bank of China Building on the Bund, Shanghai, on a postcard ca. 1900

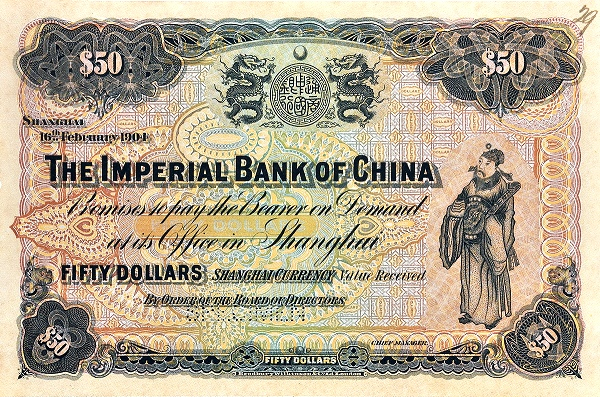
A banknote of the Imperial Bank of China of 50 dollars Shanghai currency issued in 1904.

The Imperial Bank of China, which was China's first modern bank and China's first limited liability bank, opened for business in 1897. The Imperial Bank of China is also notable for being the first indigenous Chinese bank to employ foreigners as a part of their staff and it was the first of many Chinese banks to order their banknotes from foreign printers.

The bank was organised as a joint-stock firm. The Chinese official Sheng Xuanhuai, who was a patron of the bank, adopted the internal regulations of HSBC, and its senior managers were foreign professionals. Following the early guidelines of the HSBC, the total number of banknotes issued by the Imperial Bank of China was at no time to exceed its paid-up capital, furthermore these guidelines also stipulated that ⅓ of it would have to be covered by a reserve in hard currency. Balance sheet data of the Imperial Bank of China is fragmentary but it suggests that these guidelines on banknote issuance may not have been actively used after 1906.

The fact that the IBC followed HSBC guidelines gave it a good reputation among foreign investors. Since the coffers of the imperial Chinese government had been depleted by the end of the nineteenth century, Sheng started selling equity in the new financial institution to bureaucracies both within and outside of the Chinese government. During this period Chinese official Zhang Zhidong feared that many imperial institutions would come in the hands of private owners but Sheng managed to maintain a good relationship with the imperial government despite these fears.

There is ample evidence to suggest that domestic Chinese financial institutions had lent a large number of capital to expatriate-run companies during the latter days of the Qing dynasty even when foreigner nationals were not among their main shareholders. In the year 1901 73% of the loan portfolio of the IBC was advanced to foreign firms.

After the proclamation of the Republic of China, the bank changed its English name to the Commercial Bank of China in 1912. The name more accurately translated its Chinese name and removed any link to the Qing Dynasty.

== See also ==
- Da-Qing Bank
- Banking in China
- Paper money of the Qing dynasty

== Sources ==
- Chen, Limao (陳禮茂) (2003), Zhang Zhidongzai Zhongguo tongshang yinhang chunagban guochengzhong de yanlun shuping 張之洞在中國通商銀行創辦過程中的言論述評) (in Chinese), Anhui shixue.
- Feuerwerker, Albert (1958). China's Early Industrialization Sheng Hsuan-huai (1844–1916) and Mandarin Enterprise. Cambridge, Massachusetts: Harvard University Press.
- Hamashita, Takeshi (濱下武志) (1980), Chūgokutsūshōginkō no setsuritsu to Honkon Shanhaiginkō 中国通商銀行の設立と香港上海銀行 (in Japanese), Hitotsubashironsō.
- Huang Jianhui, 黃鑒暉 (1994), Zhongguo yinhangyeshi 中國銀行業史 (in Chinese), Taiyuan: Shanxi jingji chubanshe.
