= Imperial Bank of China Building =

1907 building in Shanghai, China

Coordinates: 31.2367°N 121.4861°E

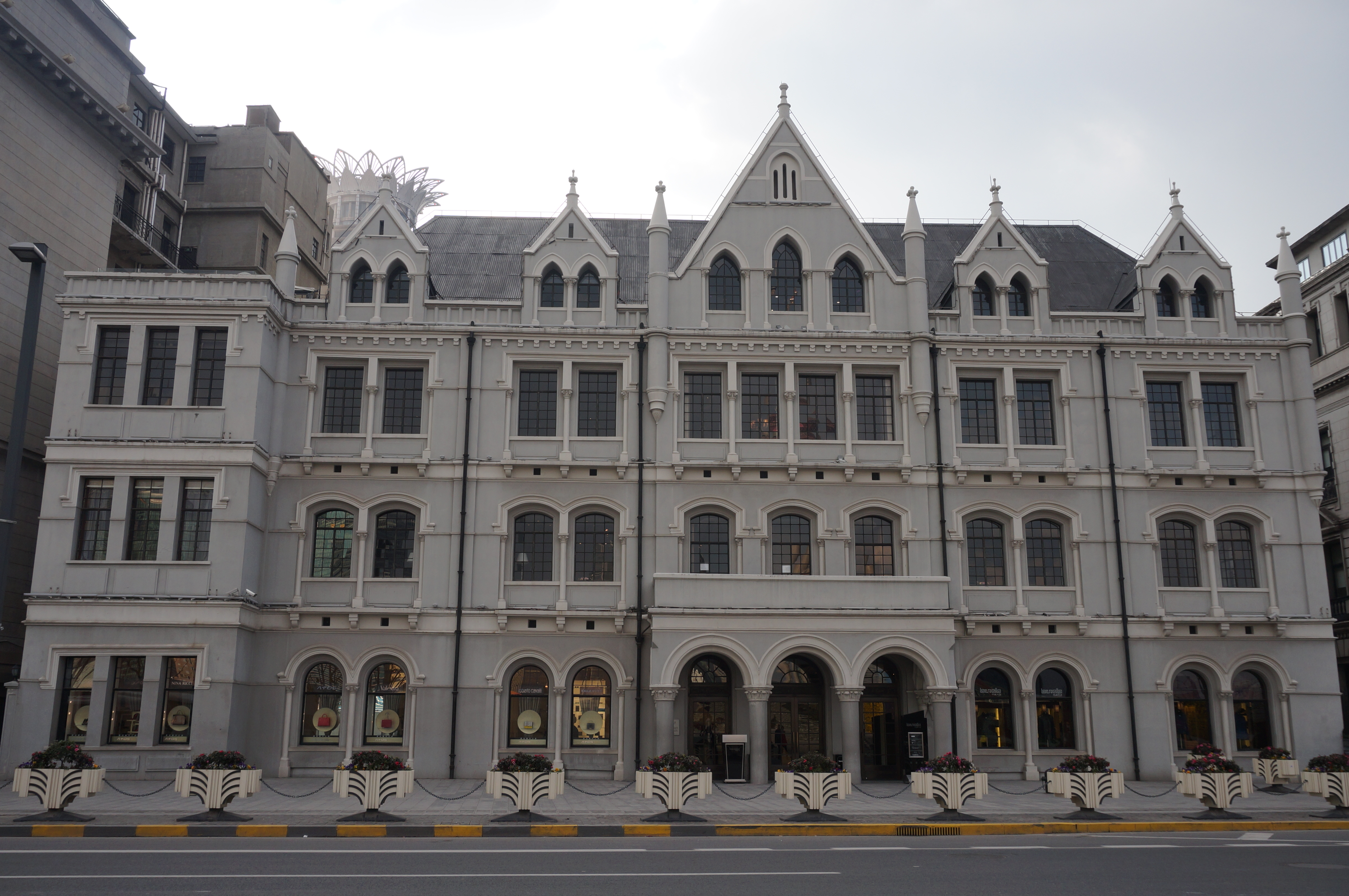
China Merchants Bank Building

Postcard of the building around 1900

The four-story Imperial Bank of China Building is a Victorian building on the Bund, Shanghai, China. It was built in the mid-1880s or earlier.

== Overview ==
The building was originally designed by British architects Morrison & Gratton for American trading firm Russell & Company. From 1897 it was the seat of the newly created Imperial Bank of China. The bank was renamed in 1913 as the Commercial Bank of China following the downfall of the Chinese imperial regime, and was later controlled by Shanghai mobster Du Yuesheng. The building was renovated in 2006.
