= Alexander I. Pogrebetsky =

Russian economist and financier

Alexander Iliych Pogrebetsky
- Алекса́ндр Ильи́ч Погребецкий
- Born: Alexander I. Pogrebetsky; 1891; Irkutsk, Russian Empire
- Died: 1952 (aged 60–61); Tel-Aviv, Israel
- Occupations: Economist, financier

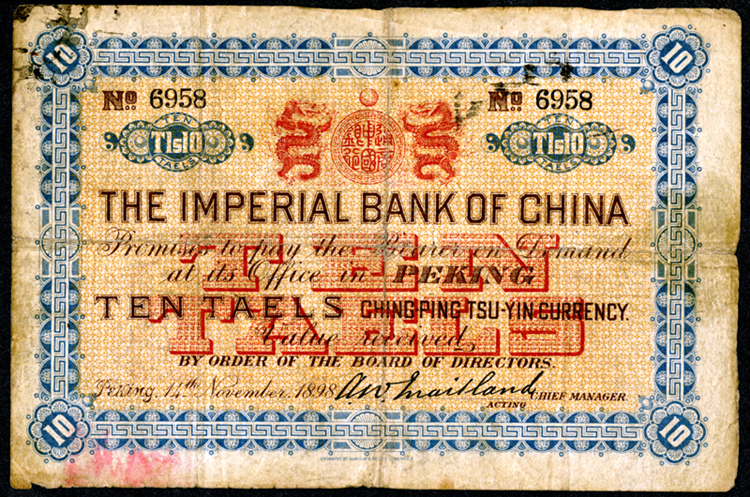
Imperial Bank of China, 1898 Peking branch Taels issue banknote from the Pogrebetsky collection.

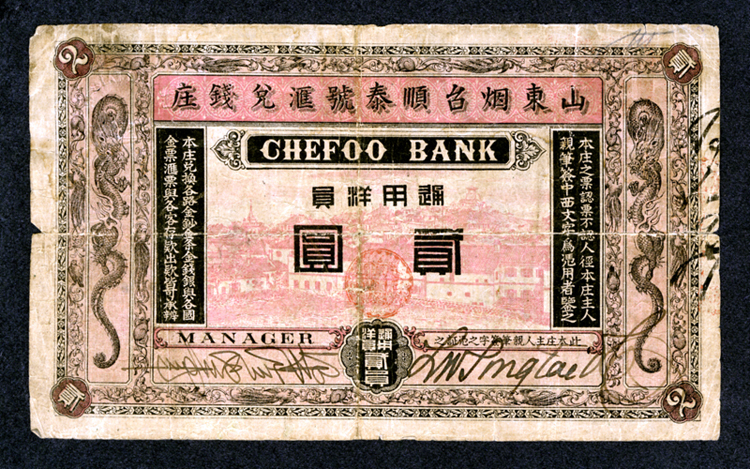
Chinese Chefoo Bank $2 private banknote, c. 1900.

Alexander Iliych Pogrebetsky (Russian: Алекса́ндр Ильи́ч Погребецкий; 1891–1952) was a Russian economist, financier, and businessman who was head of the board of directors of the Chinese Eastern Railway Company and an authority on numismatics.

== Early life and career ==
Alexander I. Pogrebetsky was born in Irkutsk, Russian Empire in 1891. He trained as an economist and financier.

== Early career ==
Pogrebetsky was director of the Department of Finance of "Centrosoyus" for the district of Irkutsk, Zabaikal, and Iakutsk provinces and Mongolia.

Later he was the interim finance manager of the Office of the Government of the Far East and a member of the Finance Commission and the National Constituent Assembly of the Far Eastern Republic (existed April 1920 to November 1922).

He was a member of the Irkutsk Political Centre an independent political group in Irkutsk during the Russian Civil War (1917–1923).

== China ==
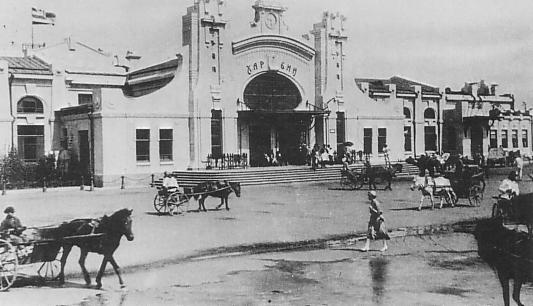
Harbin railway station, c. 1940.

Around 1920, he relocated to Harbin, China, where he became head of the board of directors of the Chinese Eastern Railway Company. He wrote financial articles for the Russian-language Vestnik Manʹchzhurii (Manchuria Monitor). Around 1935 he moved to Tianjin, where he was part owner of a private bank. He then moved to Shanghai, where he traded as the China Trading & Investment Company, Ltd.

He was closely involved with Jewish organisations during his time in China. He was a council member of the Jewish People's Bank in Harbin (1925–34) and on the council of the Jewish Commercial Bank (Harbin, 1929–34). He was a member of the Tianjin Jewish Club "Kunst" and the Shanghai Jewish Club.

== Later life ==
Around 1948, Pogrebetsky emigrated to Palestine. He died in Tel-Aviv in 1952 of liver cancer.

== Banknote collection ==
Through his work and travels, Pogrebetsky was able to create an important collection of Chinese and Asian banknotes and coins. He wrote (in Russian) Denezhnoe obrashchenie i denezhnye znaki Dal'nego Vostoka za period vojny i revoljutsii (1914-1924) (1924) (Money and bank notes of the Far East during the period of war and revolution), one of the first books on Chinese banknotes. In the 1960s or 70s, part of the collection was donated to the Smithsonian Museum. The rest of the collection remained in family hands until 2015 when it was sold in two sales by Archives International Auctions in May and December.

== Selected publications ==
- Denezhnoe obrashchenie i denezhnye znaki Dal'nego Vostoka za period vojny i revoljutsii (1914-1924), Harbin, 1924.
- Currency and finance of China, 1929. (Russian language)
- "Currency difficulties under the Kolchak government", Hoover Institution Archives, p. 3.
- "Foreign interests in China" in Manchuria Monitor, Harbin, October, 1931. (Russian with 300 word English summary)
- "Currency market of Manchuria in 1932" in Manchuria Monitor, Harbin, No. 8-9, 1933.
