= Great Ming Treasure Note =

Banknotes issued by the Ming dynasty

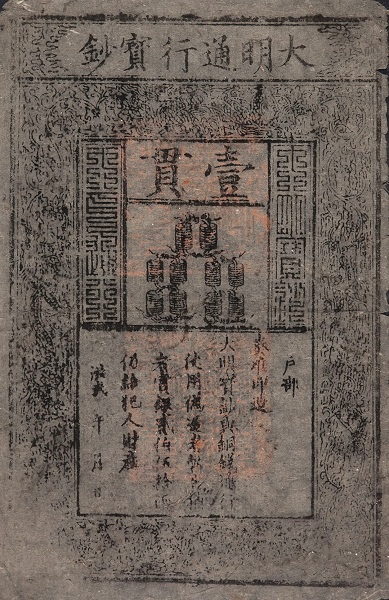
A banknote of 1 guàn (or 1000 wén) issued between 1380 and the early 16th century.

The Great Ming Treasure Note (simplified Chinese: 大明宝钞; traditional Chinese: 大明寶鈔; pinyin: dà míng bǎo chāo) or Da Ming Baochao was a series of banknotes issued during the Ming dynasty in China. They were first issued in 1375 under the Hongwu Emperor. Although initially the Great Ming Treasure Note paper money was successful, the fact that it was a fiat currency and that the government largely stopped accepting these notes caused the people to lose faith in them as a valid currency causing the price of silver relative to paper money to increase. The negative experiences with inflation that the Ming dynasty had witnessed signaled the Manchus to not repeat this mistake until the first Chinese banknotes after almost 400 years were issued again in response to the Taiping Rebellion under the Qing dynasty's Xianfeng Emperor during the mid-19th century.

== Background ==
The precursor of paper money (紙幣) known as "flying cash" were issued by the Tang dynasty; however, these bills of exchange could in no way be considered to be a form of paper money as they were not meant to be a medium of exchange and were only negotiable between two distant points. The first true paper money in the world was issued under the Song dynasty, these were promissory notes issued by merchants in Sichuan known as the Jiaozi, under the reign of Emperor Zhenzong (997–1022) the government of the Song dynasty granted a monopoly for the production of Jiaozi notes to sixteen wealthy merchants in Sichuan, as these merchants were slow to redeem their banknotes and inflation started affecting these private banknotes the government nationalised paper money in the year 1023 under the Bureau of Exchange. As these paper notes were backed by the government they were instantly successful and the people regarded them to be equally trustworthy as cash coins, other types of paper notes issued under the Song dynasty include the Huizi and the Guanzi. Before the Mongol Empire conquered China the Jurchen Jin dynasty also issued paper money, the Jiaochao (交鈔).

Before the establishment of the Ming dynasty the Mongol Yuan dynasty had suffered from a severe case of hyperinflation which made the paper money issued by them worthless. Under the reign of the Yuan dynasty copper cash coins remained in circulation with the inscriptions Zhida Tongbao (至大通寶), Dayuan Tongbao (大元通寶), and Zhizheng Tongbao (至正通寶) forming the majority of the circulating issues and "strings of cash coins" remaining a currency unit. Silver then started to occupy a paramount place in the Mongol economy and was supplemented by government issued paper money. Under the reign of Kublai Khan the Zhongtong Jiaochao (中統交鈔) was issued whose value was based on the fabric silk. In the year 1271 the Zhiyuan Baochao (至元寶鈔) was issued which was supplemented with the silver-based Zhida Yinchao (至大銀鈔), but these circulated only for a year. The final series of paper money issued by the government of the Yuan dynasty from 1350 were the Zhizheng Jiaochao (至正交鈔). A major difference between how paper money was used under the Mongols and under the Song dynasty was that, in certain regions of the Yuan dynasty, paper notes were the only acceptable form of currency and could not be exchanged in either copper cash coins or silver sycees. Exchanging paper money into copper or silver was known as duìxiàn (兌現, "convert into specie") which was the main reason why earlier forms of paper money were deemed reliable. As these regions were completely dependent on paper money inflation hit them more severely as their notes could not be converted into a currency based on any intrinsic value, for this reason the Mongols allowed their subjects to continue using copper-alloy cash coins and issued new ones every now and then. During the last few decades of the Yuan dynasty the inflation caused people to lose their trust in paper money and barter became the most common means of exchange.

== History ==
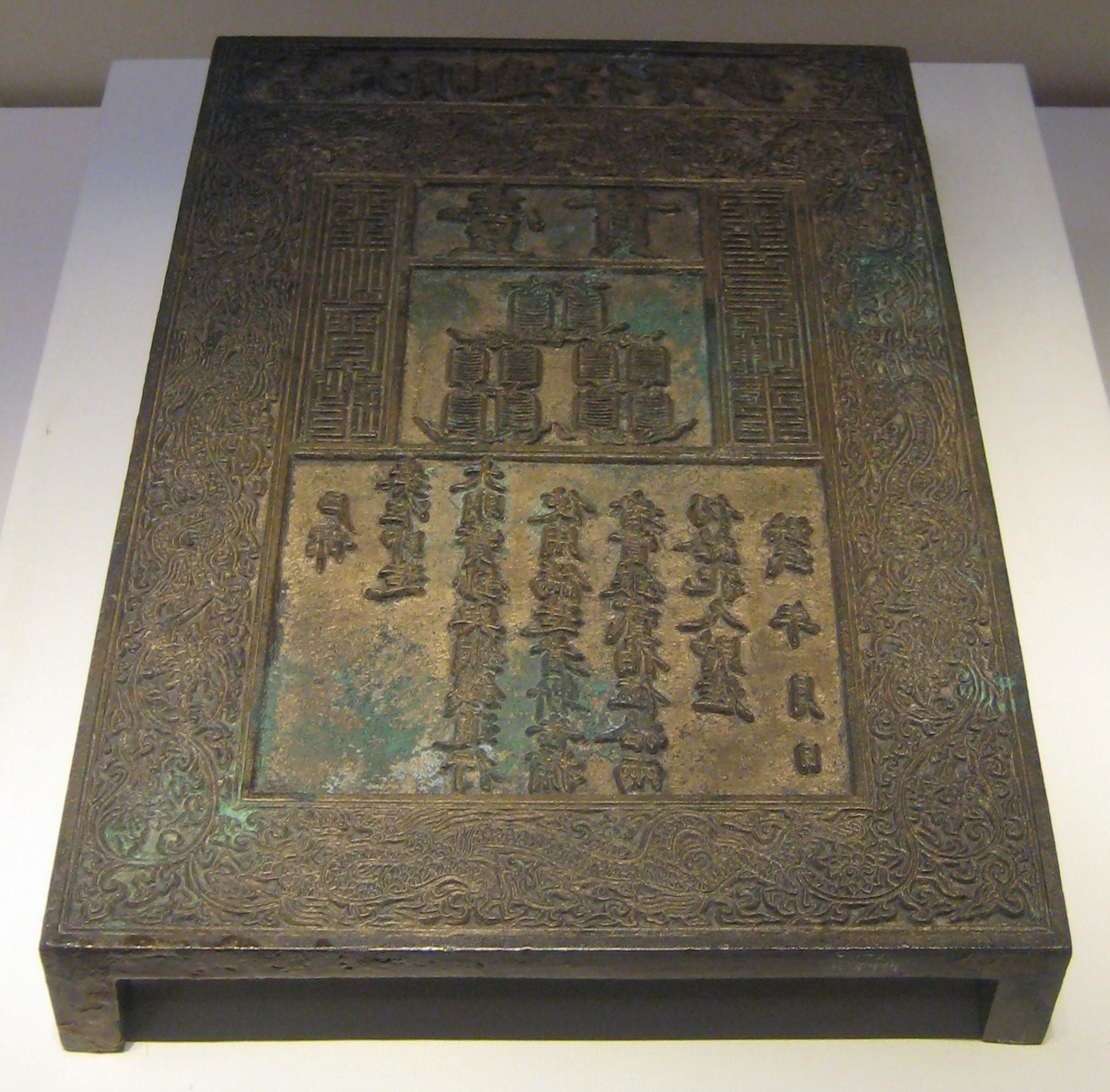
A printing plate used for the production of 1 guàn banknotes.

The first banknotes of the Ming dynasty bore the reign title of the Hongwu Emperor and were issued in the year 1375, a year prior he created the Supervisorate of Paper Money (寶鈔提舉司, bǎo chāo tí jǔ sī) to supervise their production. The initial series of the Great Ming Tongxing Baochao (大明通行寶鈔, dà míng tōng xíng bǎo chāo) were made of mulberry bark. Notes with the denomination of 1 guàn could be exchanged for one thousand bronze cash coins throughout all of the Ming Empire, this was illustrated by an image of a string of bronze cash coins split into ten segments, smaller denominations contained images fewer segments of the string and were issued in 100, 200, 300, 400, and 500 wén. The size of the 1 guàn was 36.4 × 22 cm making them the biggest paper notes ever produced in the history of China. All paper notes from this first series of the Great Ming Treasure Note contained the inscription that they were a valid currency issued by the Palace Secretariat (中書省, zhōng shū shěng), other texts explained that forgers would face punishment and those that expose these counterfeiters shall receive a high reward, finally the date of issuance was written with the era name, followed by the year, month, and day. Contrary to the paper money issued by the Song and Yuan dynasties, the Great Ming Treasure Note didn't have any geographical restrictions imposed upon them, nor did they have an expiration date. Paper notes issued by the Ming dynasty noted that they would circulate forever.

The Great Ming Treasure Note was not backed by any forms of hard currency or reserves and the government never set any limitations on their production. These circumstances led to the paper currency of the Ming dynasty to suffer from inflation. In the year 1376 new legislation was introduced to remove worn out notes from circulation and replace them with new banknotes at the cost of a fee known as "Gongmofei" (工墨費, gōng mò fèi) which was set at 30 wén per paper note. However, in the year 1380 a new law restricted the replacement of paper notes which were unreadable which caused the people to accept these older banknotes at reduced value. During this time the government stopped accepting worn out banknotes and in some cases did not accept banknotes which frustrated the people. During this period the government of the Ming dynasty issued more banknotes to the market in various forms such as military salaries (軍餉, jūn xiǎng), while they themselves hardly accepted or replaced any existing paper money causing the people to lose trust in the Great Ming Treasure Note. In the year 1380, the Imperial Secretariat was abolished, and the Ministry of Revenue (戶部, hù bù) was made responsible for the manufacture of the Great Ming Treasure Note paper notes, and the Ministry of Works (工部, gōng bù) for that of the copper-alloy Hongwu Tongbao cash coins. In 1389 the Ming government released treasury notes with lower denominations "as a help to the people" (以便民用) and improve internal trade, these were the denominations of 10, 20, 30, 40, and 50 wén and depicted unstrung cash coins. Under the reign of the Yongle Emperor the Great Ming Treasure Note was fixed to be the exclusive valid paper money for the rest of the dynasty and because of this the paper currency of the Ming would see no further alterations or reforms.

Overprinting led to severe hyperinflation and distrust of paper currency. The Hongzhi Emperor and Zhengde Emperor abolished the production and use of banknotes. By 1535, 1 guàn of paper money was valued at only 0.28th of a coin. A proposal was made in 1643 to reintroduce paper money in order to finance the expenditures caused by the difficult situation that the Ming dynasty faced at the time confronted by the rebel Li Zicheng.

The Bank of England planted a small stand of mulberry trees as an homage to these banknotes in the 1920s.

== Surviving specimens ==
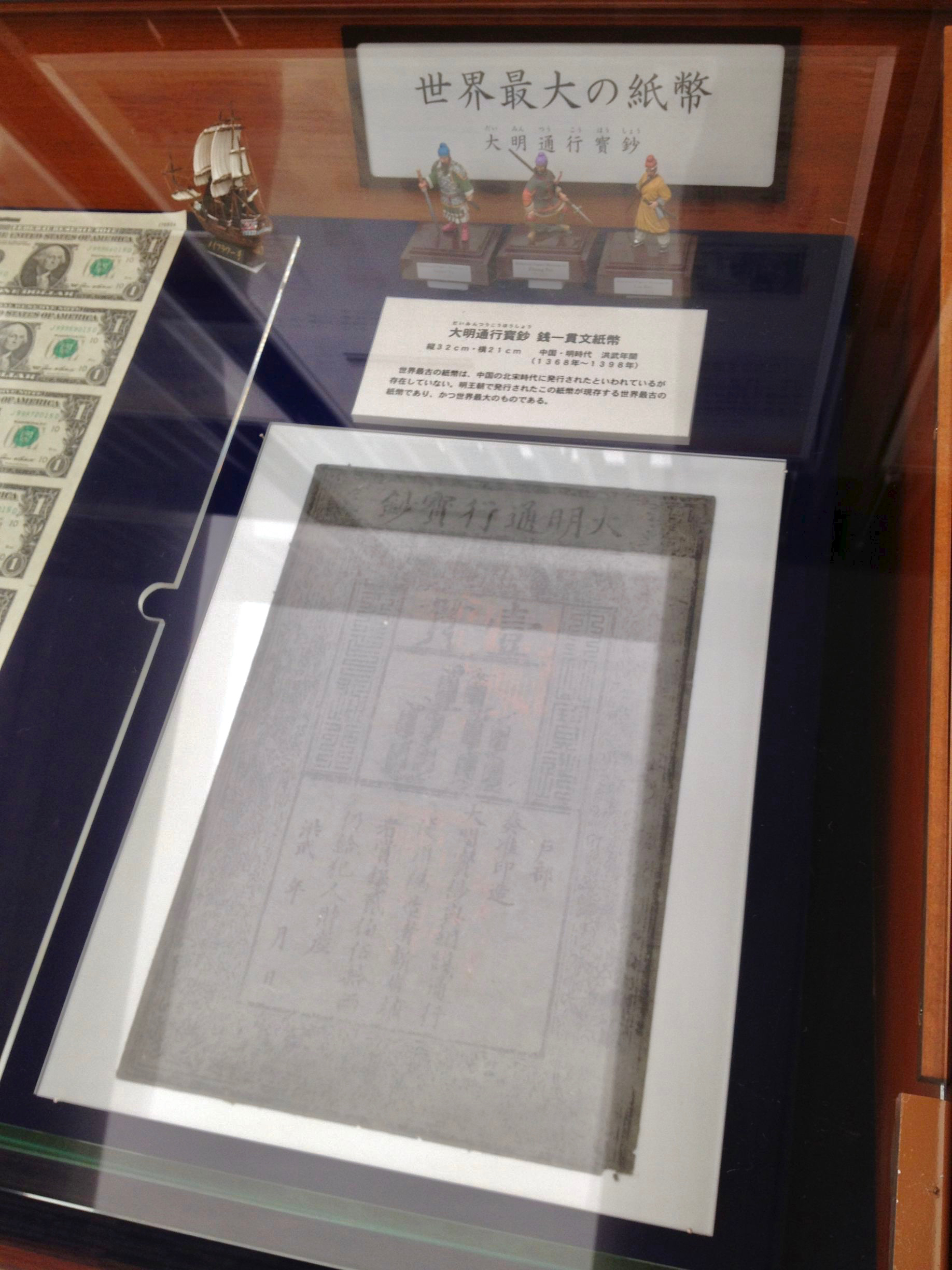
A Da-Ming Tongxing Baochao (大明通行寳鈔) banknote on display at the Bank of Tokyo-Mitsubishi UFJ Money Museum in Nagoya, Japan. Note its size compared to modern US dollar banknotes.

During the early 20th century two discoveries were made where a large number of 1 guàn Great Ming Treasure Note banknotes were uncovered, the first of these discoveries occurred in the year 1900 when foreign forces occupied the capital city of Beijing in response to the Boxer Rebellion. During the occupation a number of European soldiers of the Eight-Nation Alliance had overthrown a sacred image of Gautama Buddha in the Summer Palace which uncovered a large number of gold and silver ingots alongside various gems and jewelry and a bundle of 1 guàn Great Ming Treasure Note banknotes, as these European soldiers were happy with the gems and precious metals they acquired they handed the bundle of banknotes to US Army Surgeon Major Louis Livingston Seaman, who was a bystander and only unofficially present. Louis Seaman gave the bundle of banknotes to the museum of St. John's College in the city of Shanghai. One of these banknotes was reproduced as a lithographic facsimile in the book The Trade and Administration of the Chinese Empire written by Hosea Ballou Morse. Another batch of 1 guàn banknotes was discovered when sometime in the year 1936 one of the walls surrounding the city of Beijing was torn down. When the labourers got to the huge gate in the wall, they uncovered a large bale of 1 guàn Great Ming Treasure Note banknotes which was buried in the wall itself. After the labourers removed the soiled and damaged notes, they started selling the banknotes to bystanders standing around them. The labourers only sold them for a few copper coins each which would only amount to a couple of cents in American currency at the time. One of the bystandards who purchased one of these Great Ming Treasure Note notes was Luther Carrington Goodrich of the Yenching University who purchased two specimens for only a couple of coppers who later gave it to his friend Reverend Ballou who wrote about the account. Due to these circumstances it's relatively easy for modern collectors of banknotes and paper money to acquire the 1 guàn banknotes which are the only pre-Qing Chinese banknotes available on the market.

A handful of notes from other denominations survive as they were issued only during the reign of the first emperor. These notes as well as printing plates for denominations that have no known surviving notes are held in Chinese museums.

In 2016 art experts at Mossgreen's Auctions, a former auction house with a reputation for deceiving its bidders, were reported to have found an anachronistic 1 guàn Great Ming Treasure Note banknote hidden inside of a 1-inch fold of a wooden luohan sculpture in Melbourne, Australia. However, this specimen later turned out to be fraudulent.

== See also ==
- Economic history of China before 1912

== Sources ==
- Hartill, David (September 22, 2005). Cast Chinese Coins. Trafford, United Kingdom: Trafford Publishing. ISBN 978-1412054669.
- Huang Da (黃達), Liu Hongru (劉鴻儒), Zhang Xiao (張肖), ed. (1990). Zhongguo jinrong baike quanshu (中國金融百科全書) (Beijing: Jingji guanli chubanshe), Vol. 1, 94.
- Wu Chouzhong (吳籌中) (1993). "Zhongguo gudai zhibi (中國古代紙幣)", in Zhongguo da baike quanshu (中國大百科全書), Wenwu boguguan (文物·博物館) (Beijing/Shanghai: Zhongguo da baike quanshu chubanshe), 784.
- Xie Tianyu (謝天宇), ed. (2005). Zhongguo qianbi shoucang yu jianshang quanshu (中國錢幣收藏與鑒賞全書) (Tianjin: Tianjin guji chubanshe), Vol. 2, 506, 508.
