= Guanzi =

Guanzi may refer to:

- Guan Zhong (管仲, or Guanzi 管子 "Master Guan"), Chinese Legalist philosopher and politician
- Guanzi (text) (管子 "[Writings of] Master Guan"), Chinese text named after Guan Zhong
- Guan (instrument) (管, or guanzi 管子), Chinese double reed instrument
- Guanzi (currency), a type of banknote of the Chinese Southern Song dynasty
