= Jiaochao =

Banknote in Jin China and Yuan China

Yuan dynasty banknote (2 guàn) with its printing plate (1287)

Jiaochao (simplified Chinese: 交钞; traditional Chinese: 交鈔; pinyin: jiāochāo) is a Chinese word for banknote first used for the currency of the Jurchen-led Jin dynasty and later by the Mongol-led Yuan dynasty of China.

== Jin dynasty ==
The Jurchens swept control over northern China, conquering the Liao dynasty and half of the Song dynasty by 1142. Initially they did not have a unique currency of their own but reused the coinage of the Liao or Southern Song dynasty coinage. In 1154, Wanyan Liang issued the Jiaochao banknotes three years before minting their own distinct coinage, a sequence in Chinese history that has never happened before or since. Jiaochao came in ten denominations. Small bills came in 100, 200, 300, 500, and 700 wén while large bills were in 1, 2, 3, 5, and 10 guàn. Like previous Chinese notes, there was a fee for redeeming them for copper coins: 15 wén per guàn. Jiaochao initially had an expiration period of seven years upon issue but in 1189 this was abolished, giving notes an indefinite lifespan. Like other early Chinese paper currencies, it was a victim of overprinting which led to runaway inflation. In 1214, due to severe hyperinflation, the government began printing notes worth up to 1000 guàn. The following year, Jiaochao was replaced with a new paper currency the Baoquan (寶泉) which suffered the same fate. Up until the Mongol conquest of the Jin dynasty in 1234, the state kept releasing new types of banknotes which were rejected by the public who were only willing to accept transactions in silver.

== Mongol Empire ==
Jin and Song notes continued to circulate in territories conquered by the Mongols. In 1227, during the last year of Genghis Khan's life, he had silk-backed imitation Huizi printed. Sorghaghtani Beki, Ögedei Khan, Güyük Khan, and Möngke Khan issued various paper scrips for their occupational armies.

=== Yuan dynasty ===
In 1260, the first year of Kublai Khan's rule, he issued two different Jiaochao notes. The first in July was backed by silk but was unsuccessful. The second was in October which used the silver standard. It was the first paper currency to be used as the predominant circulating medium in the history of China. The primary press was the Imperial Mint established in 1260, probably in Yanjing. It was certainly located in Khanbaliq after that city was established the same decade. Regional capitals were sometimes authorized to print money as well. The money of the various eras of the Yuan were also separately known, as the Zhongtong notes and Zhiyuan notes of the reign of Kublai Khan. They too suffered from devaluation and hyperinflation. In 1350 the final series of banknotes, the Zhizheng Jiaochao (至正交鈔) was issued. Unlike earlier notes, this was a fiat currency and was widely rejected.

Jiaochao was described by the a number of foreign visitors, including Rustichello in his account of the travels of the Venetian Marco Polo, by William of Rubruck, and by Ibn Battuta.

The people of China do not do business for dinars and dirhams. In their country all the gold and silver they acquire they melt down into ingots, as we have said. They buy and sell with pieces of paper the size of the palm of the hand which are stamped with the Sultan's stamp. Twenty-five such pieces are called balisht, which is the same as dinar among us. If these pieces of paper become tattered from handling they take them to a house which is like our mint and receive new ones instead. The new pieces are not given against payment of any kind, for those in charge of this work receive regular salaries from the Sultan. The amir in charge of that house is one of the most important. If anyone goes to the bazaar with a silver dirham or a dinar intending to buy something with it, it is not accepted and he is disregarded until he pays with a balisht and buys what he wants.

— Ibn Battuta

=== Ilkhanate ===
Later in 1294, in order to control the treasury, Gaykhatu of the Ilkhanate in Persia attempted to introduce paper money in his khanate, which imitated the notes issued by the Yuan dynasty so closely that they even had Chinese words printed on them. However, the experiment proved to be a complete failure, and Gaykhatu was assassinated shortly afterward.

== Bibliography ==
- Gibb, H.A.R. (2010), The Travels of Ibn Battuta, AD 1325-1354, Volume IV

== See also ==
- History of Yuan
- Yuan dynasty coinage
- Economic history of China before 1912
- History of Chinese currency
- Chinese banknote seals
- Fiat money
