= Zhizheng tiaoge =

Final legal code of the Yuan dynasty

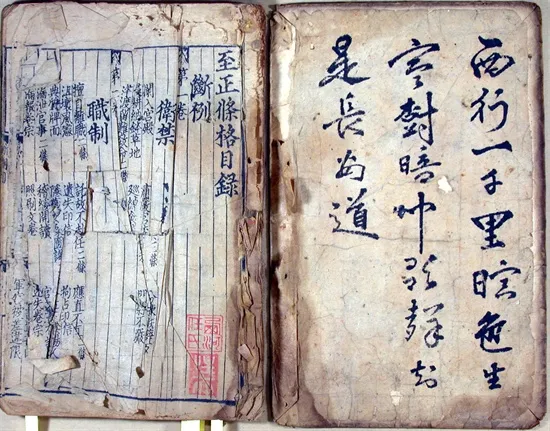
List of the Zhizheng Tiaoge

The Zhizheng tiaoge (English: Statutes of the Zhizheng Period, Korean: 지정조격, traditional Chinese: 至正條格, simplified Chinese:至正条格) is the last 'legal code' of the Yuan dynasty, promulgated in 1346. It was long believed to be lost, but a surviving copy—less than half of the original—was discovered in 2003 in a private family library in Gyeongju, South Korea. In February 2021, the Cultural Heritage Administration of Korea designated the Zhizheng tiaoge as a National Treasure of South Korea.

== Compilation ==
Genghis Khan's orders became laws known as Jasagh, but as the empire expanded, governing newly conquered regions like China through Jasagh proved unsuitable. China had a long tradition of legal code compilation, and Chinese officials petitioned the Great Khan to adopt a similar system. However, no significant efforts appear to have been made until Kublai Khan became the Great Khan in 1260.

In Kublai Khan's early reign, the laws of previous Chinese dynasties remained in unofficial use. Efforts to compile a legal code began in 1262, and Kublai reviewed the work a decade later, but it never materialized. It was only in 1291 that the Zhiyuan xinge (New statutes of the Zhiyuan period, 至元新格) was promulgated. However, this contained only a few thousand characters and primarily addressed administrative matters. As a result, even after Kublai's death, Chinese officials continued to push for a more comprehensive legal code.

The Yuan dynasty never produced a Chinese-style legal code. Instead, it compiled imperial edicts and judicial decisions for local administration. In 1323, under Great Khan Shidebala, the Da Yuan tongzhi (Comprehensive regulations of the great Yuan, 大元通制) was completed and promulgated. It consisted of two sections: statutes (taoge, 條格) and precedents (duanli, 斷例), though only part of the former survives today.

After Toghon Temür, who would become the last Great Khan of the Yuan dynasty, ascended the throne in 1333, Chinese officials again called for a new legal code. They argued that in the 20 years since the Da Yuan tongzhi, numerous laws had accumulated, leading to contradictions among different statutes. In response, revisions began in 1343, culminating in a new compilation in 1345. It was officially promulgated in 1346 (the 6th year of the Zhizheng period) as the Zhizheng tiaoge.

== Influence and discovery in Korea ==
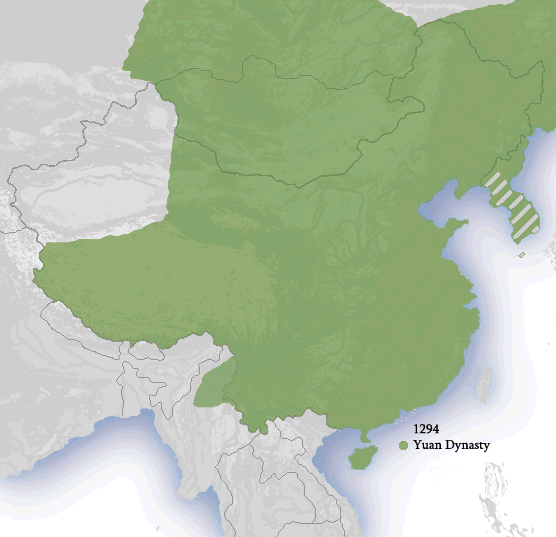
Yuan and Goryeo dynasties

The Goryeo dynasty on the Korean Peninsula first faced Mongol invasions in 1231, resisting for 28 years before surrendering in 1257. At the time, the Great Khan's throne was vacant, and Kublai was locked in a succession struggle with his younger brother. Goryeo chose to submit to Kublai, which he leveraged to his political advantage. In return, Goryeo was granted the rare privilege of retaining its royal family. Its kings also strengthened ties with the Yuan dynasty through marriages, becoming imperial sons-in-law. However, for roughly 90 years, Goryeo remained under heavy political influence from the Yuan dynasty.

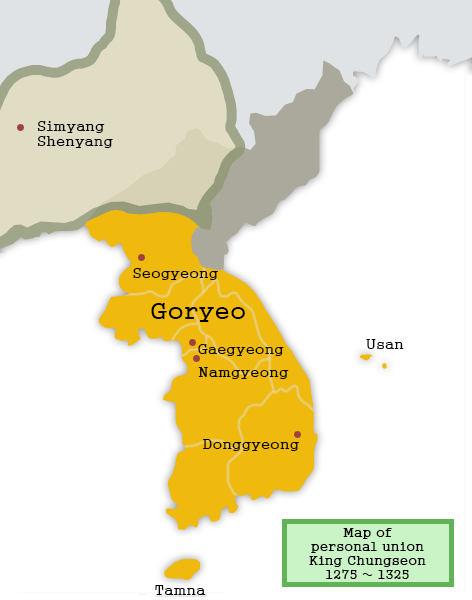
Goryeo Under Yuan Interference

The Yuan dynasty's legal influence on Goryeo became evident in its later years. In 1377, the king of Goryeo ordered judicial decisions to follow the Zhizheng tiaoge. By then, the Mongol court had already lost its capital, Dadu (Beijing), to the Hongwu Emperor's Ming dynasty forces in 1368 and had retreated to the Mongolian steppe. Yet, the Zhizheng tiaoge remained influential in Korea. Even in 1392, when Goryeo attempted to compile a new legal code, the Zhizheng tiaoge was reportedly referenced.

Following the fall of the Goryeo dynasty and the rise of the Joseon dynasty, the Zhizheng tiaoge continued to be reprinted several times by the court throughout the 15th century. It appears that the Zhizheng tiaoge may have had an even greater impact on legal reasoning in Joseon than it did in Goryeo. The Zhizheng tiaoge was one of the required subjects for examinations used to select lower-level officials responsible for judicial administration. This fact partially explains why a copy of the Zhizheng tiaoge was discovered in Gyeongju, Korea, whereas it did not survive in China.

Gyeongju (Region Painted in Red)

In 1970, parts of a Yuan 'legal code' from Khara Khoto (黑水城, Heishuicheng) were published as academic papers, sparking scholarly interest. However, scholars have debated whether they belong to the Da Yuan tongzhi or the Zhizheng tiaoge. In 2002, the Son family in Gyeongju entrusted their collection of ancient documents to the Academy of Korean Studies due to difficulties in preserving them. During cataloging, the Zhizheng tiaoge was found among the documents. At the time, it was in extremely poor condition but was later restored. It was made public in 2005, and in 2007, both a facsimile and a critical edition were published.

== Historical significance ==
Some scholars tend to undervalue the Zhizheng tiaoge by viewing it merely as a revised version of the Da Yuan tongzhi. However, in terms of scale, the Zhizheng tiaoge is approximately 1.5 times the length of the Da Yuan tongzhi, surpassing the level of a simple revision.

As noted earlier, both the Zhizheng tiaoge and its predecessor, the Da Yuan tongzhi, are divided into two main parts: the statutes (tiaoge, 條格) and precedents (duanli, 斷例) sections. By comparing the statutes (tiaoge) of the Zhizheng tiaoge with those of the Da Yuan tongzhi, it is possible to examine the social issues that emerged during the late Yuan period and the state's responses to these problems. For example, among the newly added provisions, a significant number pertain to paper money (jiaochao, 交鈔), indicating that various problems related to the use of paper money became a serious concern in the later Yuan period.

On the other hand, when it comes to the precedents (duanli) section, the Da Yuan tongzhi does not contain any surviving records of precedents. This means that the Duanli section of the Zhizheng tiaoge is entirely new material and represents a valuable subject for further research.
