= Government note =

Paper money directly issued by a government

Chinese Yuan dynasty printing plate and paper note, 1287

A government note is a form of paper money which is directly issued by a government, as opposed to banknotes which (in a strict sense) are issued by a bank which is known for that reason as a bank of issue. Government notes predate banknotes in history, but are mostly a concept of the past. In the 21st century so far, nearly all paper money has taken the form of banknotes issued by a national (or in some cases such as the euro, supranational) central bank.

== Overview ==
While there are indications of note-like instruments in earlier times, the earliest documented government notes date from the Song dynasty in 11th-century China, the so-called Jiaozi first issued by the government in 1024, then Huizi from 1160. Chinese imperial governments have kept issuing paper money intermittently since then, with episodes of loss of confidence such as the inflation that marked the later stages of the Yuan dynasty in the 14th century. The Great Ming Treasure Notes were issued shortly afterwards from 1375. The Qing dynasty issued several series of government notes, including the Hubu Guanpiao in the 17th century and Great Qing Treasure Notes in the 19th century. In Vietnam, government notes were issued at the very beginning of the Hồ dynasty in 1396. Government paper currency known as jeohwa was issued in Korea during the early Joseon period (15th-16th centuries). From around 1600 to the Bakumatsu era of the 1860s, Japanese feudal domains issued paper money known as hansatsu.

In early modern Europe, paper money first developed in the form of banknotes, starting with the seminal experience of Stockholms Banco in 1661. From there on, an increasing number of banks of issue produced banknotes across the continent, not least the Bank of England from its establishment in 1694. Government notes without the intermediation of a bank (at least after the termination of the Caisse de l'Extraordinaire in late 1792) were issued massively during the French Revolution, the so-called assignats which soon led to hyperinflation. In the 19th and 20th centuries, issuance of government notes has been infrequent in Europe as banks of issue and central banks have increasingly become the dominant issuers of currency.

In the United States, government notes were first issued by individual states during the American Revolutionary War between 1775 and 1779, known as Continental currency banknotes. Paper money was then mainly issued by banks, even though the U.S. Treasury occasionally printed Treasury Notes of its own. From the time of the National Bank Act in the early 1860s, United States Notes became the main form of paper currency in the country, even though National Bank Notes were still issued by federally-chartered ("national") banks until the 1930s. United States Notes were in turn fully replaced by Federal Reserve Notes in 1971, marking the end of government note issuance in the country.

In Canada, government notes were first issued in 1866. They coexisted with commercial banknotes for several decades, with the government focusing its issuance on lower denominations for which it granted itself a monopoly in 1870. That division of labor only ended when Canada returned to the gold standard on 1 July 1926, by which time only the government notes (known as Dominion notes) retained legal tender status. In 1935, Dominion notes were finally replaced by banknotes of the newly created Bank of Canada.

In other parts of the world during the 19th and 20th centuries, government notes have occasionally been issued in periods of political transition, war or turmoil, e.g. in the Ottoman Empire in the 1840s and 1850s, Austria in 1866, Japan in the early Meiji era, Poland in the late 1930s, India in 1940, and Indonesia from independence until 1968.

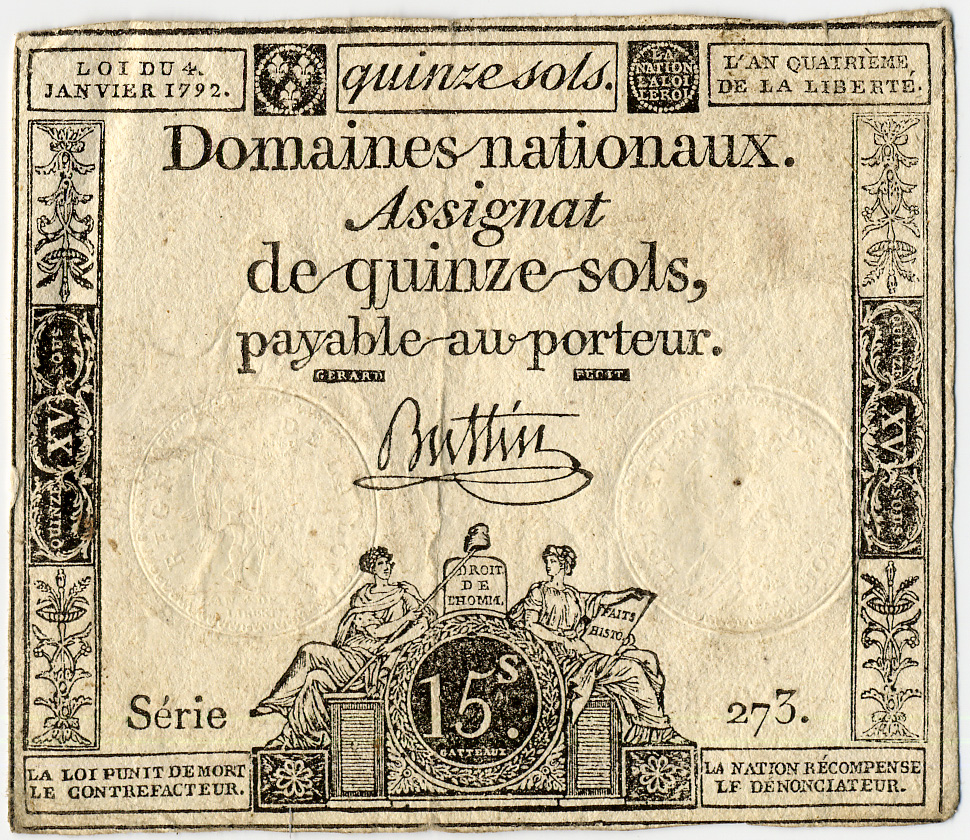
Assignat of the French First Republic, 1795

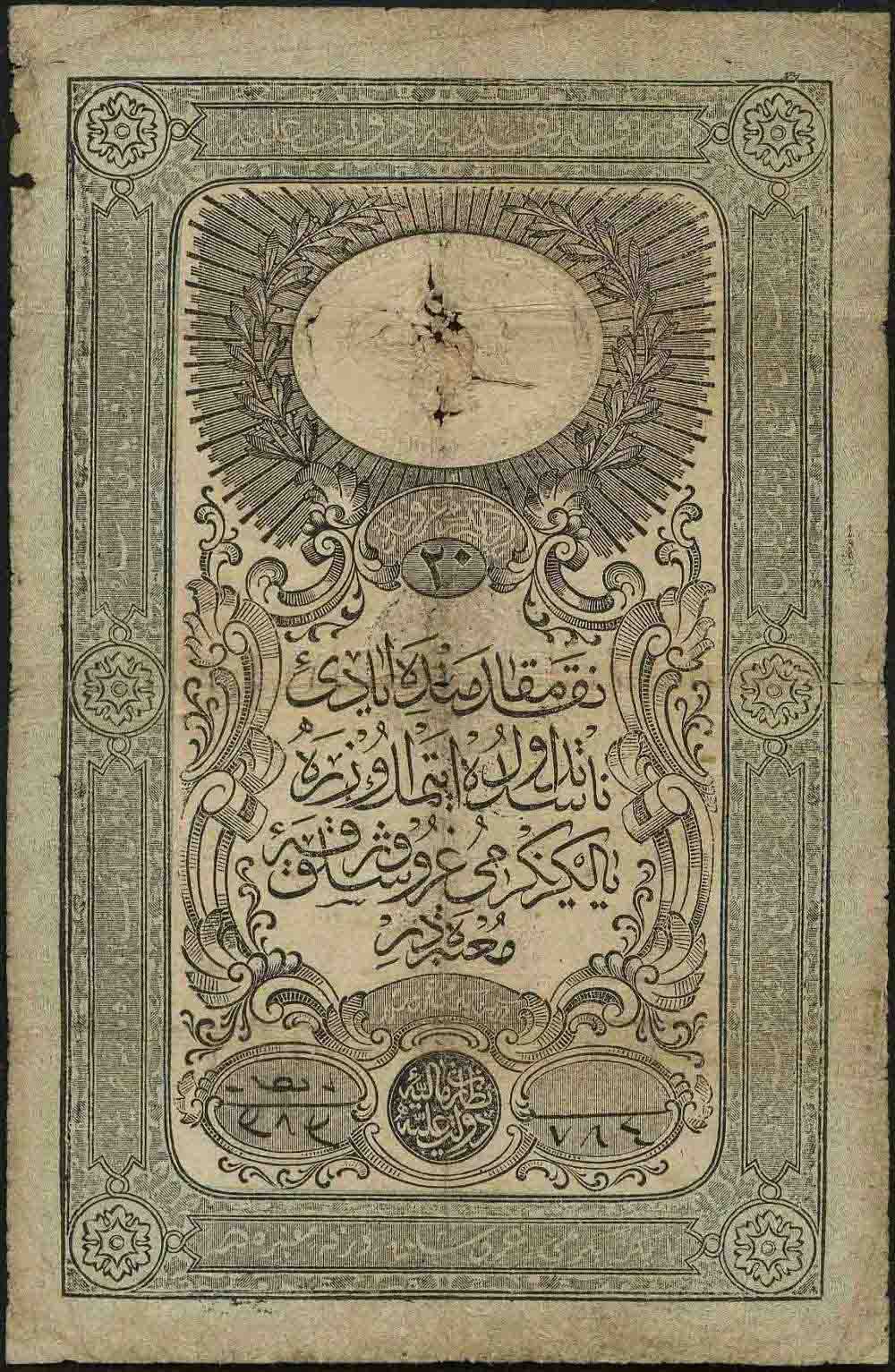
Kaime issued by the Ottoman Empire, 1852

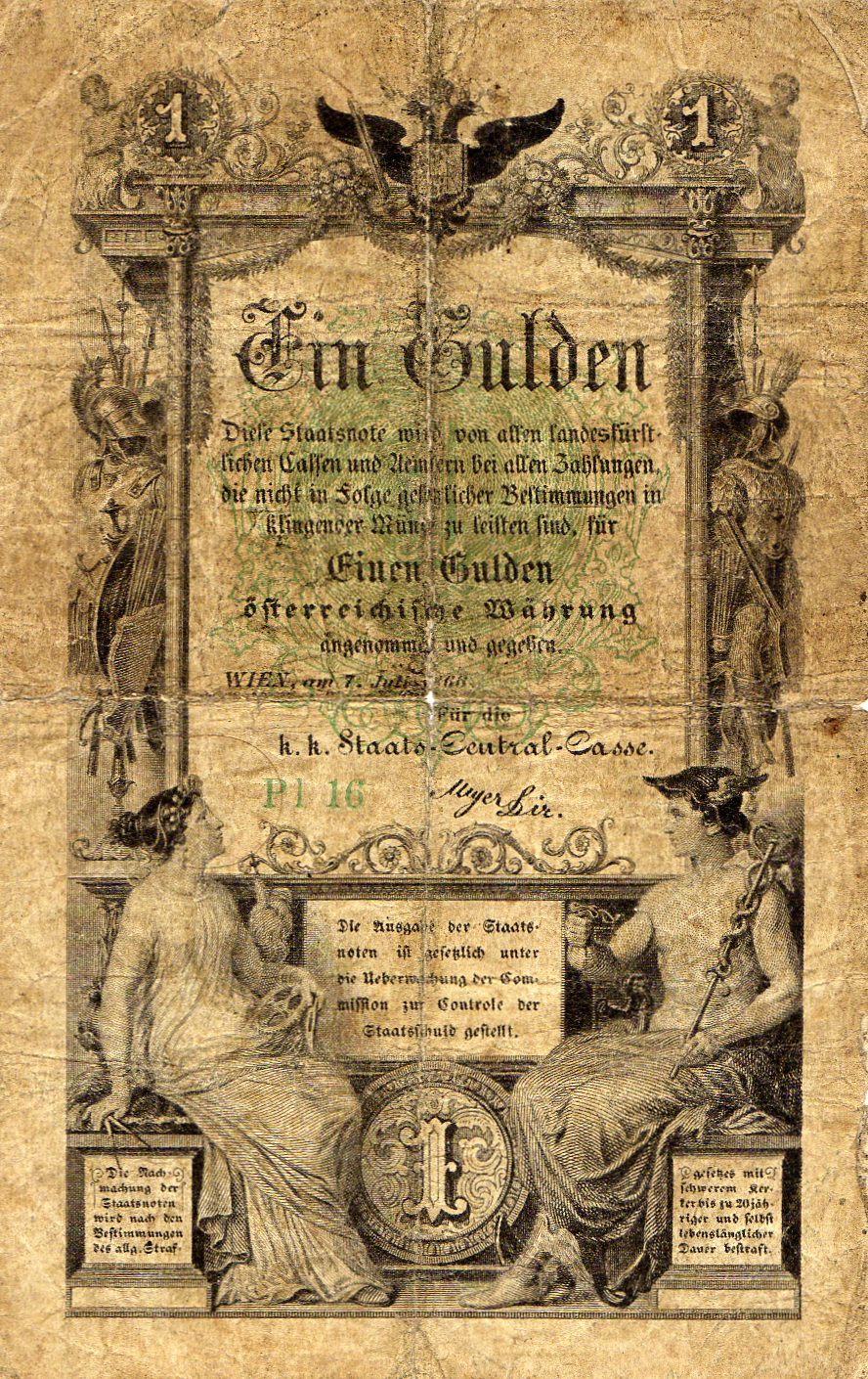
Wartime Staatsnote of the Austrian Empire, 1866

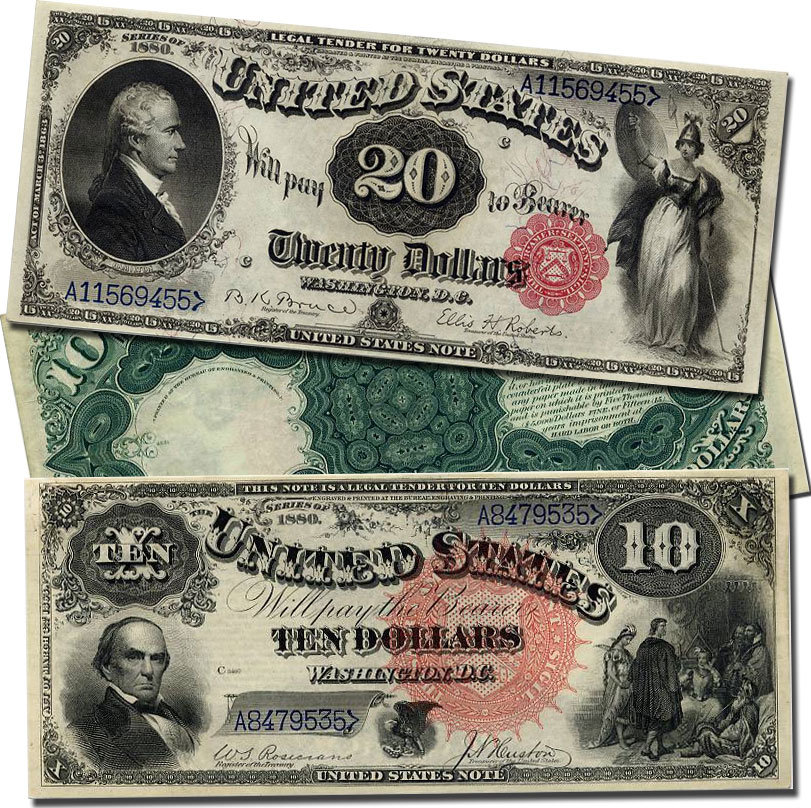
United States Notes, 1880

== Issuance by local governments ==
In some instances, notes have been issued by local governments, typically in reaction to conditions of monetary scarcity. For example, the city of New Orleans issued its own notes following the panic of 1837, backed by future tax revenue. Local merchants accepted the city's notes for a few years, but a gap in convertibility with competing private banknotes resulted in a run in May 1842 that put an end to the episode.

== Issuance by government-owned enterprises ==
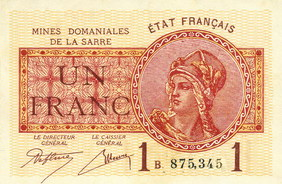
Note of one Saar franc issued by the local mines, 1923

On occasion, a government has found it convenient to delegate the issuance of paper money to a specific government office or nonbank government-owned enterprise. In the first decade of its administration of the Territory of the Saar Basin under a League of Nations mandate, the French government thus used the office des mines domaniales françaises de la Sarre (lit. 'Office of the French state-owned mines of the Saar Basin') to issue the local Saar franc (pegged to the French franc) until 1930, when they were replaced by government notes directly issued by the French Treasury. The office des mines domaniales was a state-owned enterprise managed from Saarbrücken, whose ownership was transferred from Prussia to the French state by the Treaty of Versailles and whose Prussian civil servant managers were replaced by French Corps des mines engineers. The notes of the mines domaniales was known locally as Grubengeld (lit. 'coal mine money').

== See also ==
- Complementary currency
- History of money
