= Huizi =

Huizi may refer to:

- Hui Shi (380 BC – 305 BC), Chinese philosopher
- Huizi (currency), banknote of the Chinese Southern Song dynasty
