= String of cash =

Historical currency unit

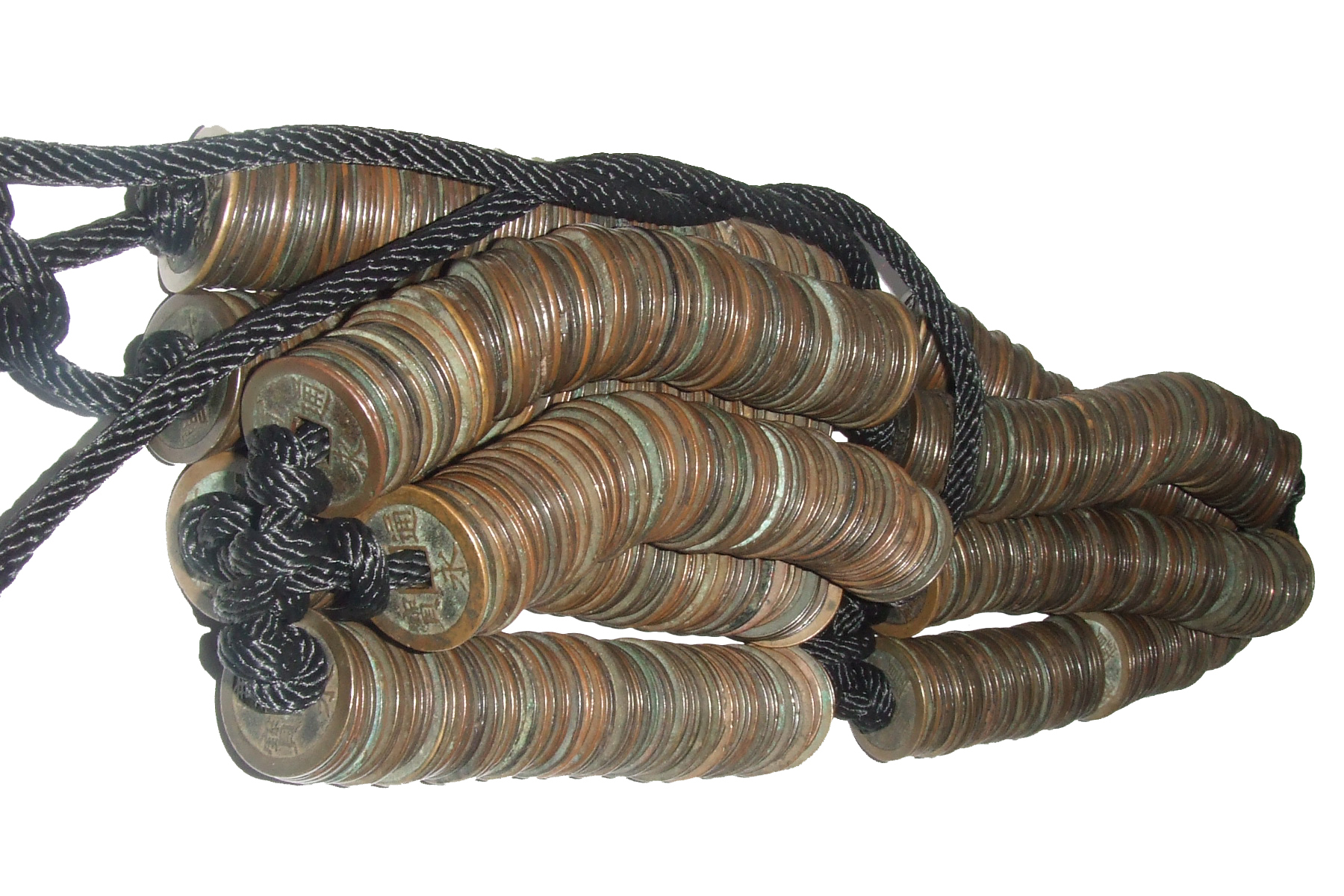
Strings of 1 kanmon coins

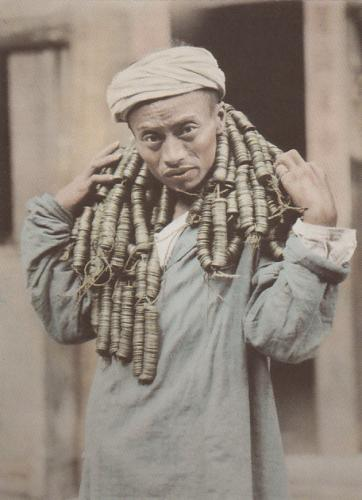
A Sichuanese man carrying 13,500 cash coins

A string of cash coins (Traditional Chinese: 貫, 索, 緡, 繦, 鏹, 吊, 串, 弔, 錢貫, 貫錢; Vietnamese: Xâu tiền; French: Ligature de sapèques) refers to a historical Chinese, Japanese, Korean, Ryukyuan, and Vietnamese currency unit that was used as a superunit of the Chinese cash, Japanese mon, Korean mun, Ryukyuan mon, and Vietnamese văn currencies. The square hole in the middle of cash coins served to allow for them to be strung together in strings. The term would later also be used on banknotes and served there as a superunit of wén (文). Usually 1000 wén, but the number could be substantially different depending on the time and place. Prior to the Song dynasty strings of cash coins were called guàn (貫), suǒ (索), or mín (緡), while during the Ming and Qing dynasties they were called chuàn (串) or diào (吊). In Japan and Vietnam the term 貫 would continue to be used until the abolition of cash coins in those respective countries.

During the Qing dynasty a string of 1000 cash coins valued at 1 tael of silver, although variants of regional standards as low as 500 cash coins per string also existed. A total of 1000 coins strung together were referred to as a chuàn (串) or diào (吊) and were accepted by traders and merchants per string because counting the individual coins would take too much time. The coins were made up of bronze to protect China's economy. Because the strings were often accepted without being checked for damaged coins and coins of inferior quality and copper alloys, these strings would eventually be accepted based on their nominal value rather than their weight; this system is comparable to that of a fiat currency. Because the counting and stringing together of cash coins was such a time-consuming task, people known as qiánpù (錢鋪) would string cash coins together in strings of 100 coins, of which ten would form a single chuàn. The qiánpù would receive payment for their services in the form of taking a few cash coins from every string they composed. Because of this, a chuàn was more likely to consist of 990 coins rather than 1000 coins, and because the profession of qiánpù had become a universally accepted practice, these chuàns were often still nominally valued at 1000 cash coins. The number of coins in a single string was locally determined, as in one district a string could consist of 980 cash coins, while in another district this could only be 965 cash coins. These numbers were based on the local salaries of the qiánpù. During the Qing dynasty the qiánpù would often search for older and rarer coins to sell these to coin collectors at a higher price.

The number of cash coins which had to be strung together to form a string differed due to region, time period, or by the materials used in the manufacture thereof. For example, under the reign of the Tự Đức Emperor of the Nguyễn dynasty, one string of cash coins included 600 zinc coins, while during the later days of the French colonial period, a string of cash coins was 500 copper alloy coins. In Vietnam a string of cash coins had the nominal value of 1 Mexican peso or 1 French Indochinese piastre. During the late 19th century in Qing China, some currency systems were named after how many cash coins made up a string, such as the Jingqian (京錢, 'metropolitan cash') or Zhongqian (中錢), which was an exchange rate that was used in the capital city of Beijing. The Jingqian system allowed a nominal debt of 2 wén (文) which could be paid out using only one physical cash coin instead of two. In this system a string of Beijing cash coins (吊) required only 500 cash coins as opposed to the majority of China, which used 1000 cash coins for a string (串). Meanwhile, in the Dongqian (東錢, 'Eastern cash') system, an exchange rate used for cash coins in the Fengtian province, only 160 cash coins were needed to make up a string. During the Qing dynasty period, the term chuàn was used to designate long strings while the term diào was used to design short strings.

Although the term appeared frequently on banknotes, the only cash coin to have ever had the currency unit "String of cash coins" as a part of its inscription was the Nguyễn dynasty-era Tự Đức Bảo Sao (嗣德寶鈔) 1 quán cash coin (準當一貫, chuẩn đang nhất quán), which was worth 600 văn (or 60 mạch).

== Background ==
Much like how cash coins are counted in wén (文), until the Qin dynasty, China used cowry shells and bronze cowry shells which were denominated in bèi (貝) and a string of cowry shells was called a péng (朋). However, it is currently not known how much bèi was in a péng.

== Strings of cash coin units during the Qing dynasty ==
During the Qing dynasty different number of cash coins were used to make up strings of cash coins.

- 1 chuàn (串) = 1000 wén (文)
- 1 metropolitan diào (吊) = 1000 metropolitan cash (京錢)
- 1 metropolitan diào (吊) = 500 pieces of "standard cash coins" (制錢, before 1853)
- 1 metropolitan diào (吊) = 50 pieces of "big cash coins" (大錢, after 1861)

In actual circulation, however, cash coins throughout Chinese history were put on strings in ten groups of (supposedly) one hundred coins each; these strings were separated by a knot between each group. During the Qing dynasty period, strings of cash coins rarely actually contained 1000 cash coins and usually had something like 950 or 980 or a similar quantity; these amounts were due to local preferences rather than being random in any form. In the larger cities cash shops would make specific strings of cash coins for specific markets. The cash shops existed because at the time there were many different kinds of cash coins circulating in China, including old Chinese cash coins from previous dynasties (古錢), Korean cash coins, Japanese cash coins (倭錢), Vietnamese cash coins, large and small genuine Qing dynasty cash coins, and different kinds of counterfeits, such as illegally private-minted cash coins. Some of these strings would contain exclusively genuine Zhiqian, while other strings could contain between 30% and 50% of counterfeit and underweight cash coins. The actual number of cash coins on a string and the percentage of counterfeits in a string was generally known to everyone who resided in that town by the type of knots that were used. Each of these different kind of strings of cash coins fulfilled different functions. For example, one string of cash coins was acceptable to be used in a local grain market, while it would not be accepted at a meat market, while another type of string was able to be used in both markets but not to pay taxes. The cash shops sorted all cash coins into very specific categories, then would make up appropriate kinds of strings that were intended for use in specific markets or to pay taxes to the government.

== Silk as currency ==
Silk was used as a commodity worth as much as gold. Silk started out as primarily produced by the Han Dynasty. While strings of cash coin were used as currency, it was not very valuable, only being worth its weight in the material it was made of (bronze and sometimes silver). Silk was used to purchase many things but lost its value over time as middle eastern communities started producing their own silk and using it for trade. This over abundance of silk caused it to lose its worth. Strings of cash coins were mainly used for small purchases while silk was for larger trades.

== Banknotes ==
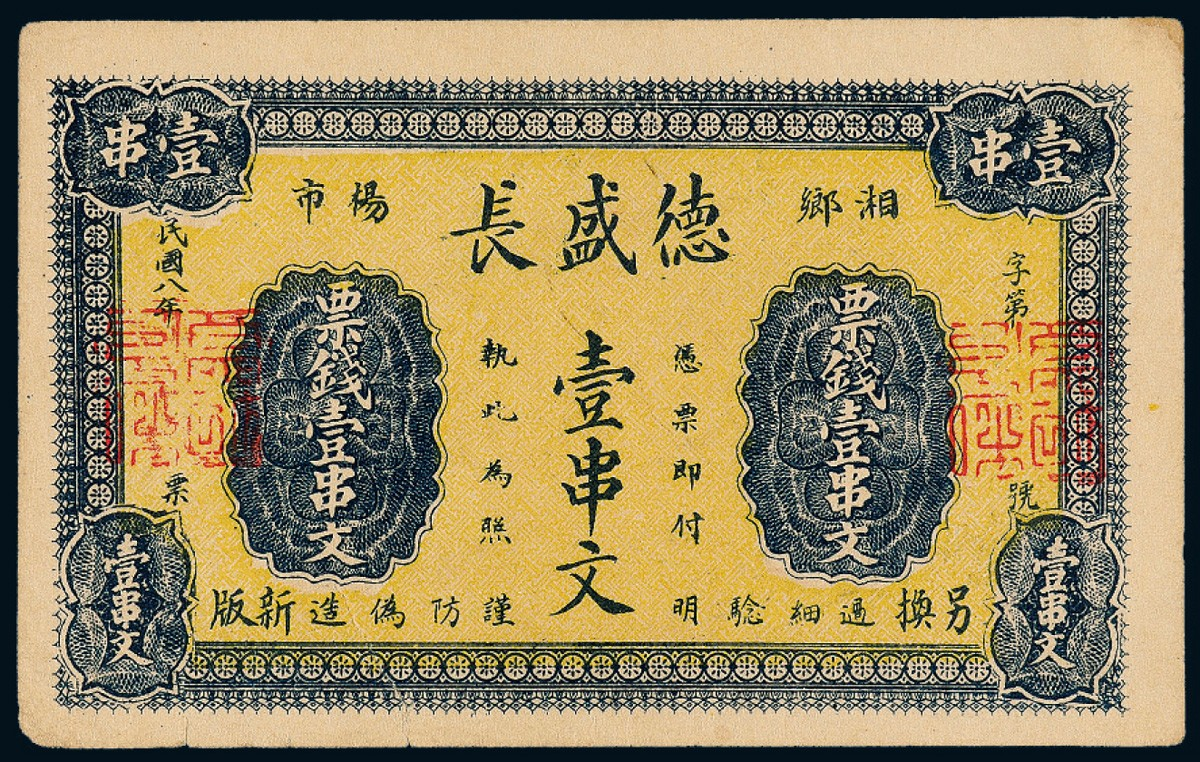
A banknote from the Republic of China of 1 chuàn wén (串文, or a string of cash coins) issued by the Da Sheng Chang in the year 1919.

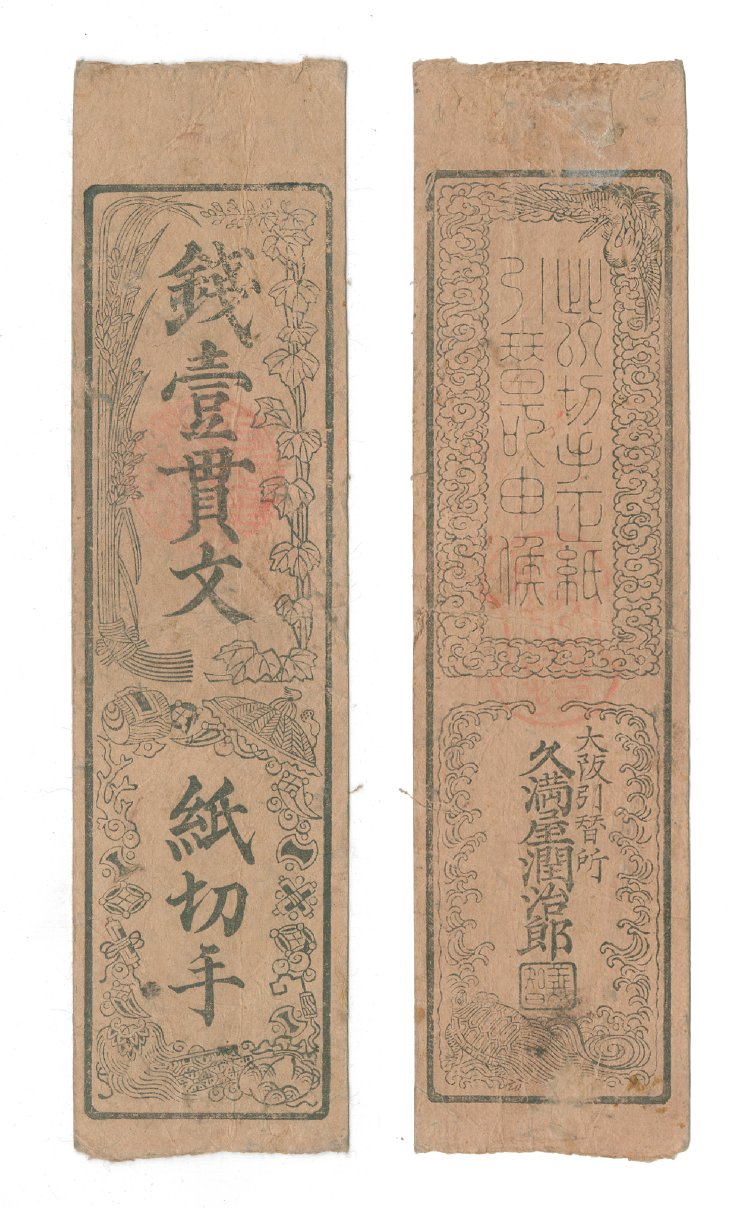
A Hansatsu local banknote of 1 kanmon (貫文) issued during the Edo period in Japan from the British Museum.

During the Song dynasty the first series of standard government Jiaozi notes were issued in 1024 with denominations like 1 guàn (貫, or 700 wén), 1 mín (緡, or 1000 wén), up to 10 guàn. In 1039 only banknotes of 5 guàn and 10 guàn were issued, and in 1068 a denomination of 1 guàn was introduced which became forty percent of all circulating Jiaozi banknotes. The Huizi also continued to use these currency units. Between the years of 1161 and 1166 the government of the Song dynasty had produced 28,000,000 dào (道, equal to a guàn or 1000 wén) in Huizi notes. The exchange rate between Guanzi banknotes and copper cash coins was 1 guàn for 770 wén while Huizi notes of the eighteenth production period were valued at 3 guàn for 1 wén. During the last days of the Southern Song dynasty, China was suffering from inflation to the point that the value of the Huizi had lowered so much that a guàn was only accepted at between 300 and 400 cash coins, which caused people to start hoarding the coins, removing them from circulation which had a devastating effect on the economy. As the Mongols continued marching south, the Chinese military required more money causing the government to print an excessive amount of Huizi banknotes. The guàn currency unit would later also be used by the Jurchen Jin dynasty and the Mongol Yuan dynasty on their Jiaochao banknotes, though due to hyperinflation these currencies would not be able to be exchanged with any real cash coins and under Mongol rule non-paper forms of currency were abolished.

From the early fourteenth century to the early sixteenth century in Japan, banknotes which were known as saifu were used for transactions, payments, and the transfer of funds between remote regions. Most of these saifu banknotes had a value of 10 kanmon (10,000 mon, or 10 strings of 1000 copper coins), these notes also circulated among the general public.

Under the Ming dynasty the Great Ming Treasure Note would also continue using guàn as a currency unit for its denominations. The 1 guàn Great Ming Treasure Note banknote was originally good for 1,000 copper-alloy cash coins and had a size of 36.4×22 cm, making it the largest Chinese paper banknote ever produced. In the middle of its design was an image of a string of cash coins (錢貫) to show what it was worth. At the bottom of the Great Ming Treasure Note banknote was text which explained that it was issued by the Zhongshusheng (中書省, 'Palace Secretariat'), that it was a valid type of currency used concurrently with copper-alloy cash coins, and that counterfeiters would face a penalty and those who notified the authorities of counterfeiting would be highly rewarded. Despite originally circulating concurrently with cash coins, the Great Ming Treasure Note became a fiat currency and would later no longer be able to be exchanged for any actual cash coins.

Privately produced banknotes of the Qing dynasty, as is usual for China, had a great variety of names designating them across the country with names being used such as Zhuangpiao (莊票), Pingtie (憑帖), Duitie (兌帖), Shangtie (上帖), Hupingtie (壺瓶帖), or Qitie (期帖). The denominations used on them varied greatly with some reaching as high as 5 diào (吊).

During the early days of the Republic of China, the currency units of chuàn wén and diào wén were still being used on banknotes and zhuangpiao. The Hupeh Provincial Bank (湖北官錢局, Hubei Guan-Qianju), a provincial government-owned qianzhuang created by Zhang Zhidong, issued their own banknotes denominated both in taels and in chuàn (串), which were known as the Hubei Guanpiao (湖北官票), until 1927.

== Bamboo tallies ==
Some Chinese bamboo tallies, which circulated in the provinces of Jiangsu, Zhejiang, and Shandong from the 1870s until the 1940s, used "strings of cash coins" as a currency unit, but also contained additional inscriptions stating that they would not be paid out in "regular" cash coins. For example, a bamboo tally with the text "串錢壹仟文" (Chuàn qián yīqiān wén, 'a string of 1000 cash coins') could contain the additional information that it if were to be redeemed, it would be paid out in Daqian (大錢) of "10 cash" coins. This bamboo tally would then be paid out in a string of 100 Daqian of 10 wén.

Below their denominations many bamboo tallies had the Chinese characters xin hao (信號, 'warranty mark') to indicate that the bamboo tally is trustworthy to be worth its stated (nominal) value.

Another way to indicate what type of cash coins would be paid out is if the bamboo tally did or did not contain the inscription 10 wén (十文) below its top hole. It could then contain an inscription like "串錢貳百文" (Chuàn qián èrbǎi wén, 'a string of 200 cash coins') that would only have to be paid out in a string of 20 cash coins of 10 wén rather than 200 cash coins of 1 wén. The issuing authorities would do this due to the concept of "token" money that the Chinese employed at the time. As the Qing dynasty's government started manufacturing Daqian since the Xianfeng period that contained high nominal values but had intrinsic values that were only slightly more valuable than the low denomination coinages, the issuer of the bamboo tally would be able to make a profit off of this situation. This was because the bamboo tally in question would be valued more than the promised redeemed value.

In general, bamboo tallies in the region were not always redeemed and would continue to circulate in their local areas as a type of alternative currency as long as the local populace would maintain their trust that the bamboo token had value or worth. This situation translated to the profits of issuing the tally being kept by the issuing authority. And if the bamboo tally were to be redeemed, the redeemer would receive a weight of bronze or brass much lower than the bamboo tally's nominal value.

== Kan (weight unit) ==
The kan (Japanese 貫, alternatively kamme 貫目) as a Japanese unit of measurement is a bead weight for cultured pearls. Kan equals one thousand monme or 3.75 kg. The modern kan was officially established in the Japanese Law of Weights & Measures of 1891. It is still used worldwide as a weight indicator for cultured pearls.

== Contemporary Western commentaries on strings of cash coins ==
=== Qing dynasty ===
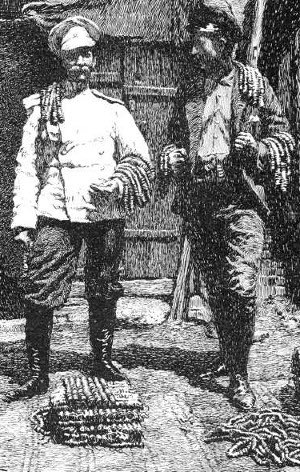
William Sachtleben (right) with a Russian friend with enough strings of cash coins to pay for a meal at a restaurant in Ghulja in 1892.

American bicyclist William Sachtleben visited the city of Ghulja in 1892 and was preparing to cycle to Beijing; while preparing for his trip together with the Russian consul, he noted the difficulty in transporting strings of cash coins, stating:

"We thought we had sufficient money to carry us, or, rather, as much as we could carry...for the weight of the Chinese money necessary for a journey of over three thousand miles was, as the Russian consul thought, one of the greatest of our almost insurmountable obstacles. In the interior of China there is no coin except the chen or sapeks, an alloy of copper and tin, in the form of a disk, having a hole in the center by which the coins may be strung together."

— William Lewis Sachtleben

Sachtleben noted how there were no money exchange banks in the Chinese interior. Of the ability to use and exchange the cash coins Sachtleben noted:

"All, however, would have to be weighed in the tinza, or small Chinese scales we carried with us, and on which were marked the fün, tchan, and liang of the monetary scale. But the value of these terms is reckoned in chen (Chinese cash coins), and changes with almost every district. This necessity for vigilance, together with the frequency of bad silver and loaded yambas, and the propensity of the Chinese to "knock down" on even the smallest purchase, tends to convert a traveler in China into a veritable Shylock."

— William Lewis Sachtleben

Eventually Sachtleben and the Russian consul managed to exchange the strings of cash coins for silver coins as they were easier to carry on their trip, but noted how the money that they had to carry was much heavier than their camera equipment.

British visitor Isabella Bird wrote of the amount of coins the Chinese used which she witnessed in her travels:

"Exchanging eighteen shillings English for brass cash, the weight of them amounted to seventy-two pounds, which had to be carried by the coolies".

— Isabella Lucy Bird

=== Nguyễn dynasty (French Indochina) ===
During the colonial era in French Cochinchina, Chinese sapèques (known as lý) were exclusively used as casino tokens by gambling houses and were not used for other purchases unless trade was being conducted with Qing China. The general conversion rate was 1000 lý = 1 lạng = 7.50 French francs. The sapèques which circulated at the time of French Cochinchina were made from zinc and had a very distinctive square centre hole allowing for them to be strung into strings of 1000 zinc sapèques or 600 copper-alloy sapèques. These strings were known as quán tiền (貫錢) in Vietnamese and as ligatures or chapalets in French. Each string is further subdivided into 10 tiền consisting of 60 sapèques; these coins were valued in their quantity rather than in weight. These coins usually featured the reign or era title of the reigning Nguyễn monarch and were extremely poorly manufactured with bad alloys, causing the strings to often break. Many sapèques broke, resulting in considerable losses for their owners due to their brittleness. Charles Lemire described the heavy nature and difficult mobility of strings of sapèques as "a currency worthy of Lycurgus of Sparta" and non numerantur, sed ponderantur ("they are not counted but weighed").

To the French, zinc coinage also presented a huge inconvenience since their colonisation of Cochinchina in 1859, as the exchange between French francs and zinc Tự Đức Thông Bảo (嗣德通寶) văn meant that a large amount of zinc coins were exchanged for the French franc. Zinc cash coins often broke during transportation as the strings that kept them together would often snap. The coins would fall to the ground and a great number of them would break into pieces. These coins were also less resistant to oxidation, causing them to corrode faster than other coinages.

"Another serious disadvantage consisted in the total absence of token coinages other than the inconvenient sapèque one of zinc: one needed an artillery van to go exchange 1,000 francs in ligatures for the one sapèques, since it had the weight of a barrel and half.... and at the market, the chicken weighed some times less than its price in currency."

— J. Silvestre, Monnaies et de Médailles de l'Annam et de la Cochinchine Française (1883)

Prior to 1849 brass coins had become an extreme rarity and only circulated in the provinces surrounding the capital cities of Vietnam, but under Tự Đức, new regulations and (uniform) standards for copper cash coins were created to help promote their usage. Between 1868 and 1872 brass coins were only around 50% copper and 50% zinc. Due to the natural scarcity of copper in Vietnam, the country always lacked the resources to produce sufficient copper coinage for circulation.

== Non-tender usage ==
Strings of cash coin, specifically the Wen on the strings, have many uses outside of currency. Wen has been used like a contract, locking people into a promise. It was used as a ritual item, believed to bring those who owned some good luck. These practices are also known as Feng shui. They were gifted to others at weddings, funerals, and other holidays. Wen was also used to identify one's social standing in their community, as using it for purchases was a sign that a person was flourishing and was able to provide for a family. All of these uses tend to happen primarily in Chinese-American communities.

== Storage and variety ==
Basic wooden bowls to intricately designed vases have been used to store coins and keep them safe. Bowls and pottery fragments have been discovered all over Asia and the Mogao Caves. Many coins of the same name and origin were discovered with separate designs. In modern day, these strings of cash coins provide us with significant historical material, as we study the craftsmanship of these ancient coins while numismatists value their discovery.

== Production ==
To create the wen put on these strings a coin tree must first be made. The tree is composed of many individual molds, allowing for the mass production of wen. The coins were created using mixes of separate metals such as bronze, zinc, and silver. These metals are melted down and poured into a mold created by "mother coins". Once the mold dries and the metal hardens, the 'tree' is removed and the coins separated. They are sanded down around the edges and dispersed into the empire.

== Galleries ==
=== Strings of cash coins ===
Strings of cash coins
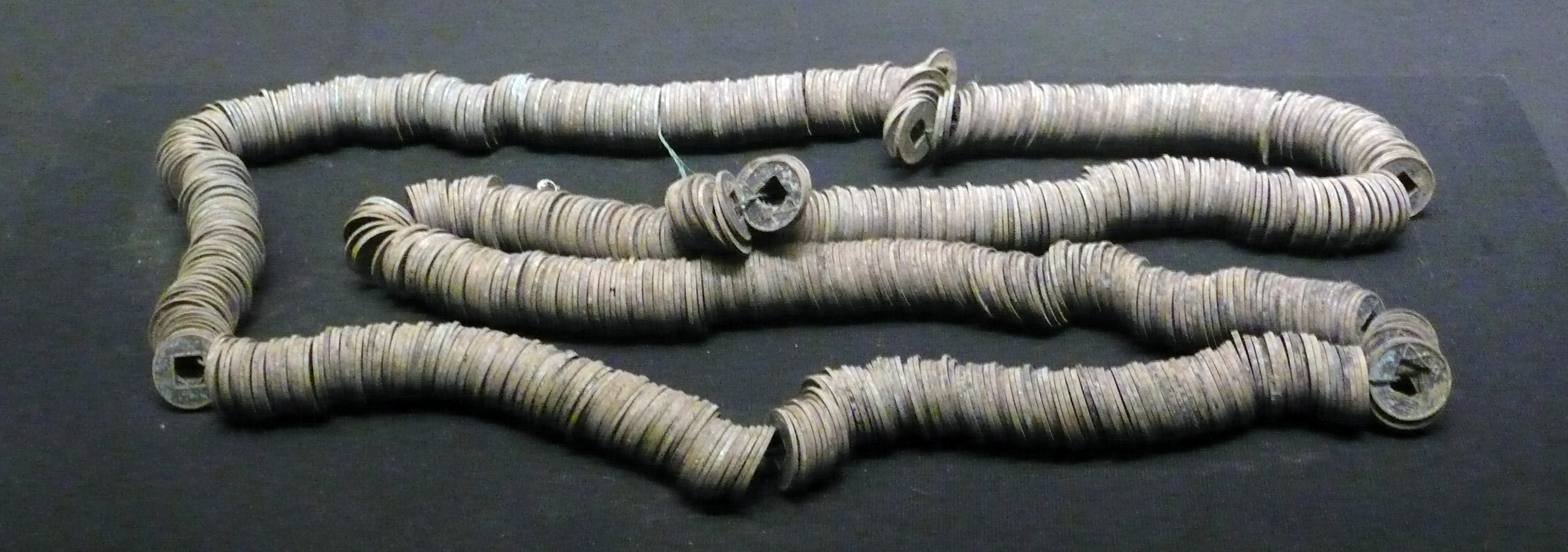
Strings of Western Han dynasty Wu Zhu (五銖) cash coins.

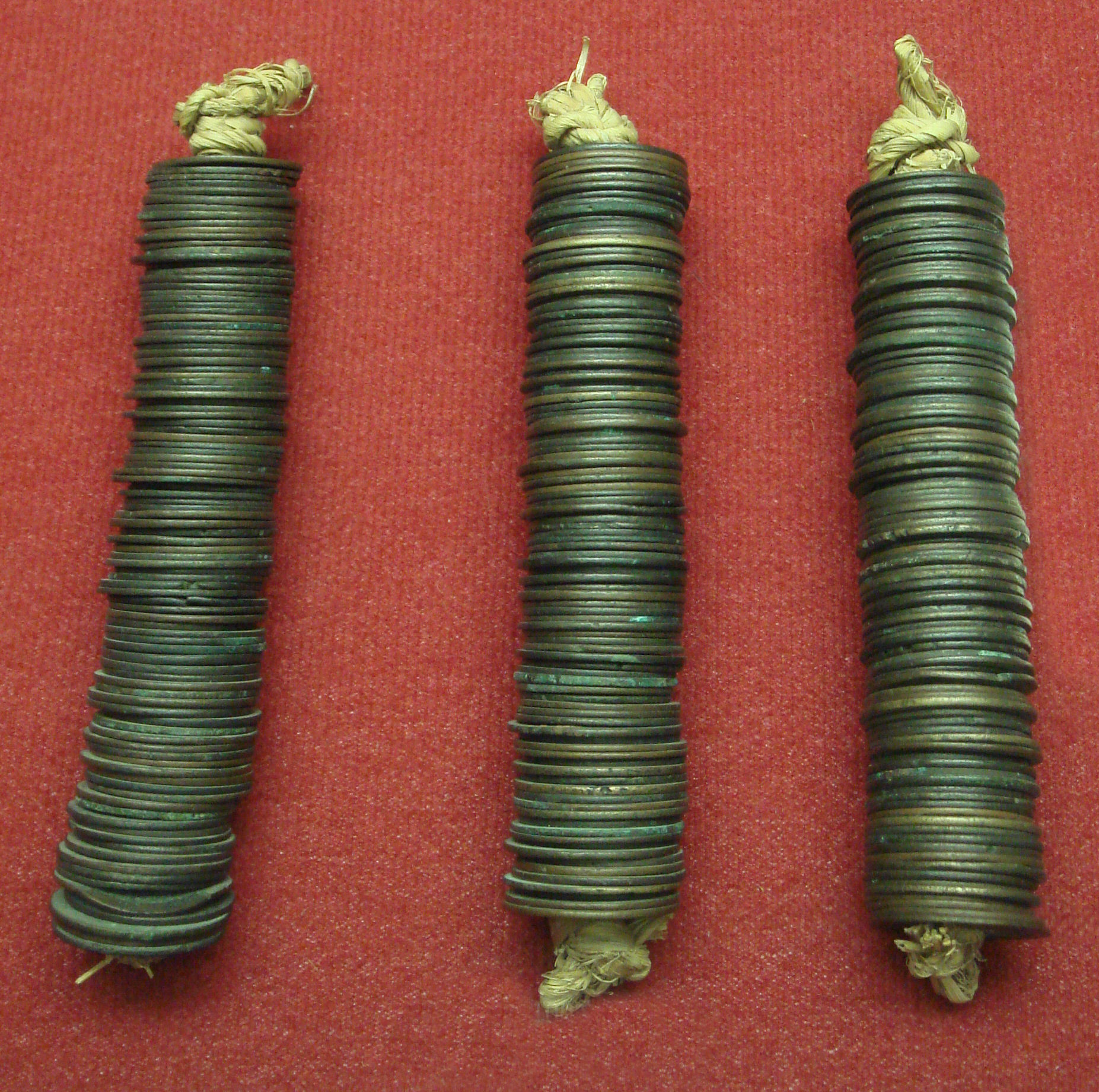
Bundles of 100 copper Mon coins; they were the official currency of Japan in the Muromachi period, from 1336 until 1870. These coins are from the Edo period.

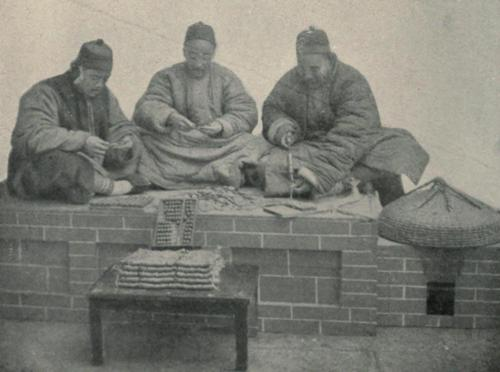
A group of Qing dynasty-era qiánpù stringing cash coins together in 1899.

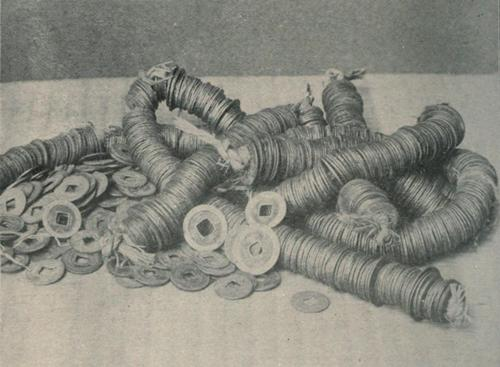
An 1899 photograph of Qing dynasty cash coins.

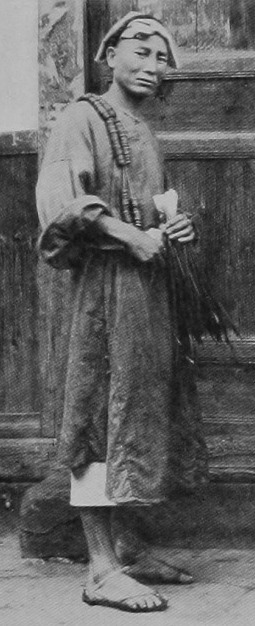
A Qing dynasty-era man carrying strings of cash coins on his shoulder in the year 1900.

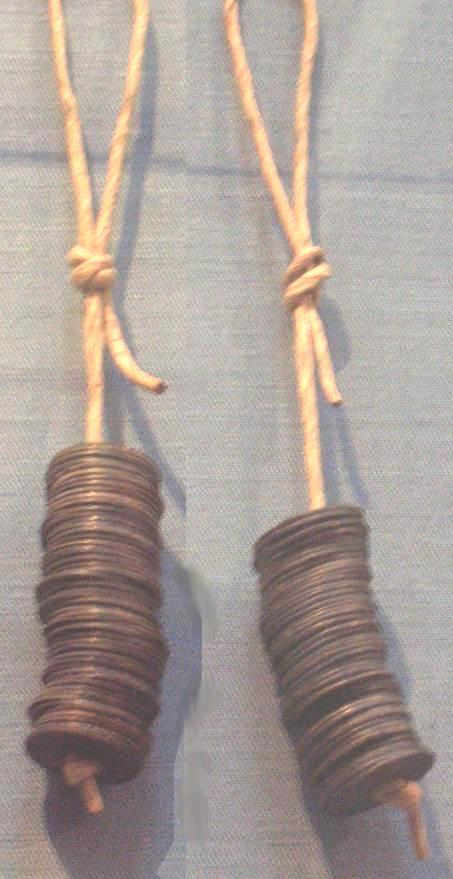
Strings of cash coins on display at the Kunsthistorisches Museum in Vienna, Austria.

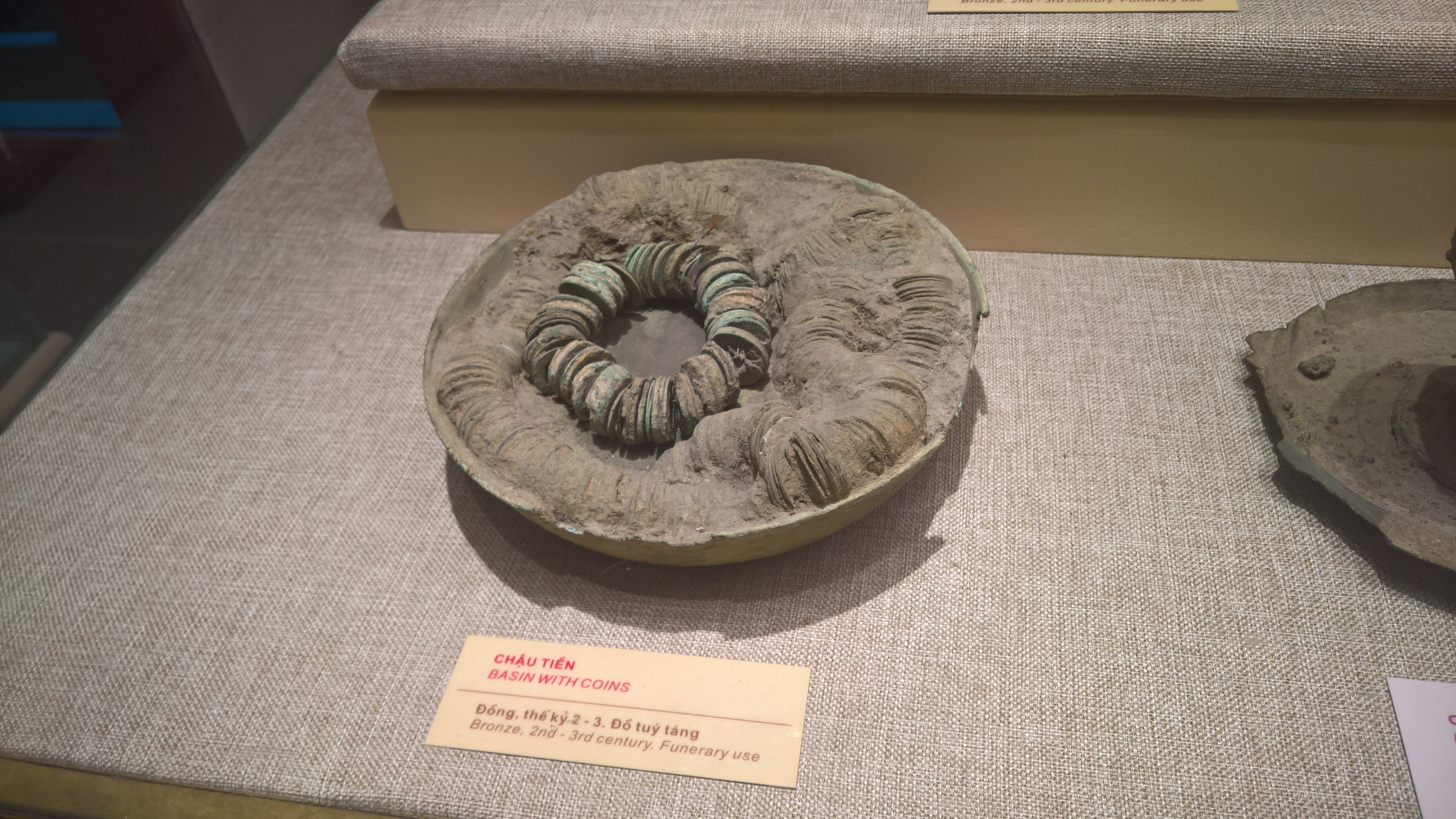
An unearthed bowl with a string of cash coins in it on display at the National Museum of Vietnamese History in Hanoi.

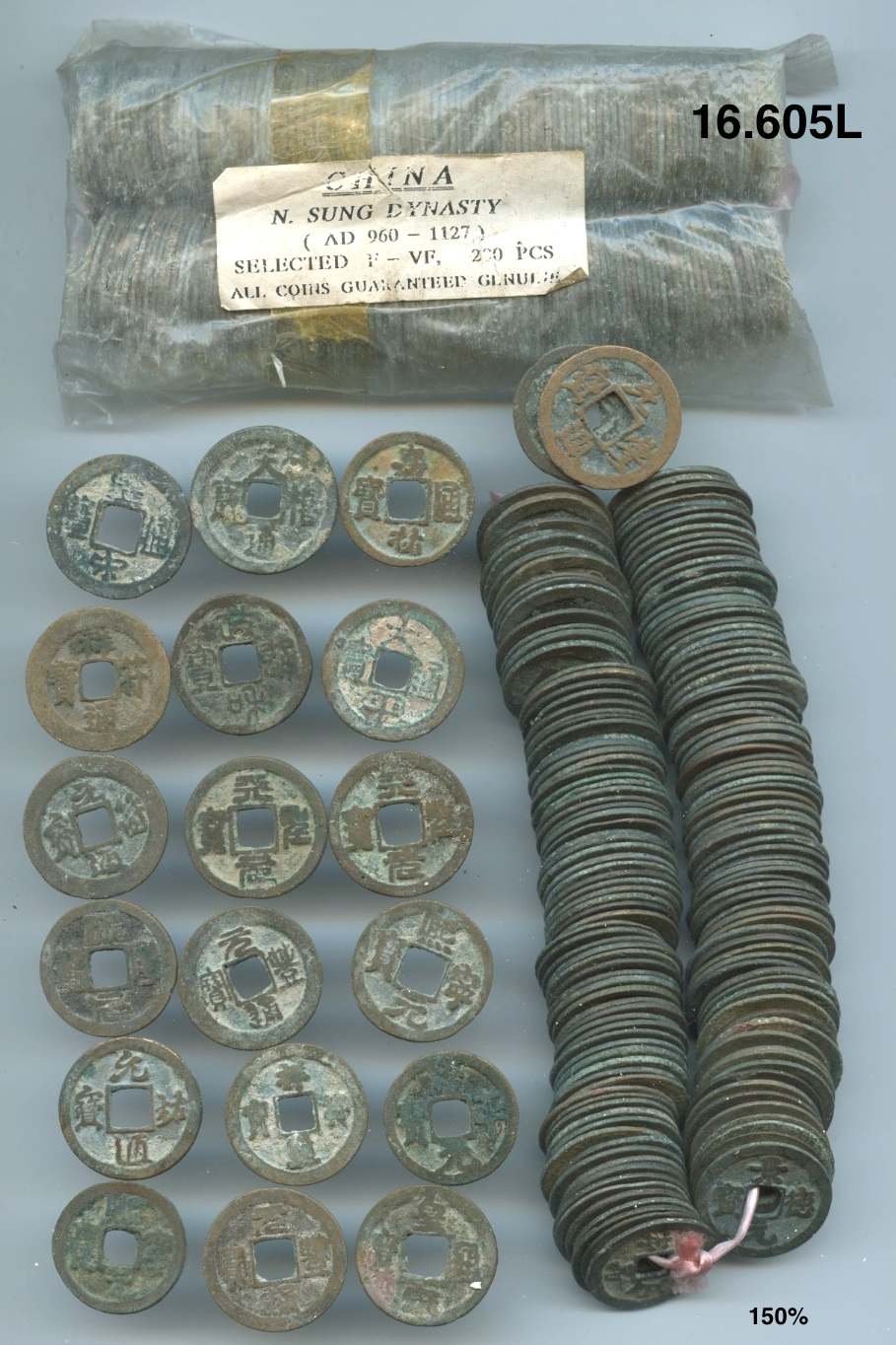
Strings of 200 cash coins from the Northern Song dynasty period.

=== Strings of cash coins used as a currency unit on banknotes ===
Banknotes denominated in "String(s) of cash coins"
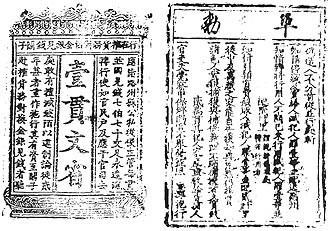
A Guanzi banknote of 1 guàn wén (貫文) issued by the Southern Song dynasty.

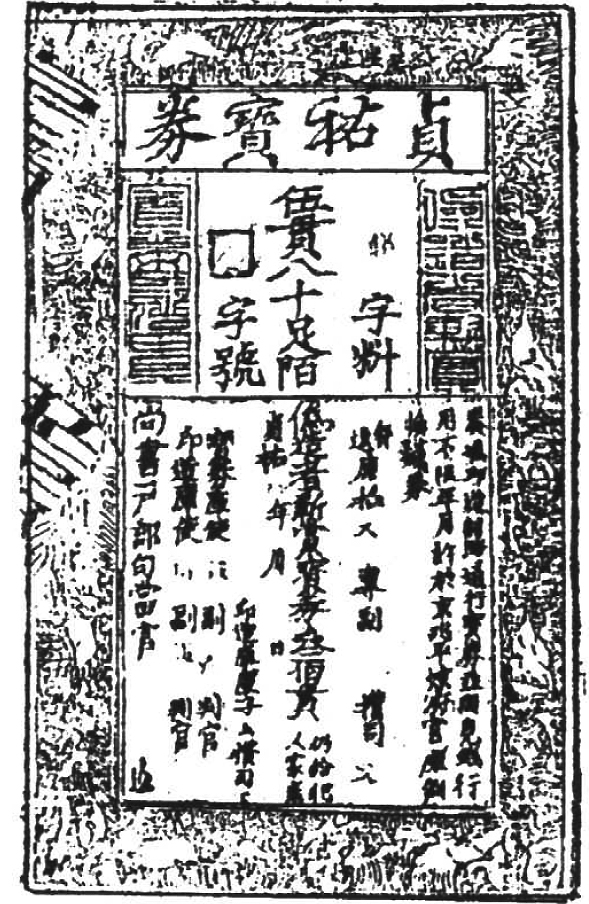
A Jiaochao banknote of 5 guàn (貫) issued by the Jurchen Jin dynasty.

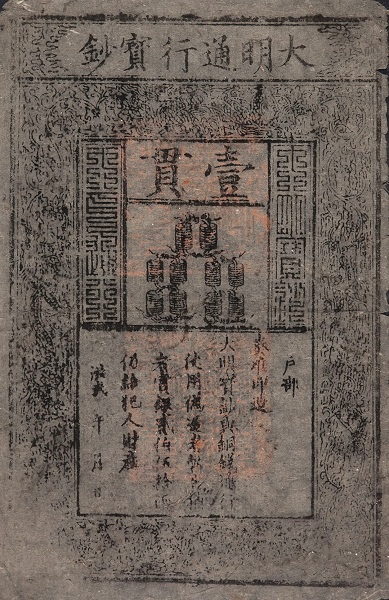
A Great Ming Treasure Note banknote of 1 guàn (貫) issued by the Ming dynasty.

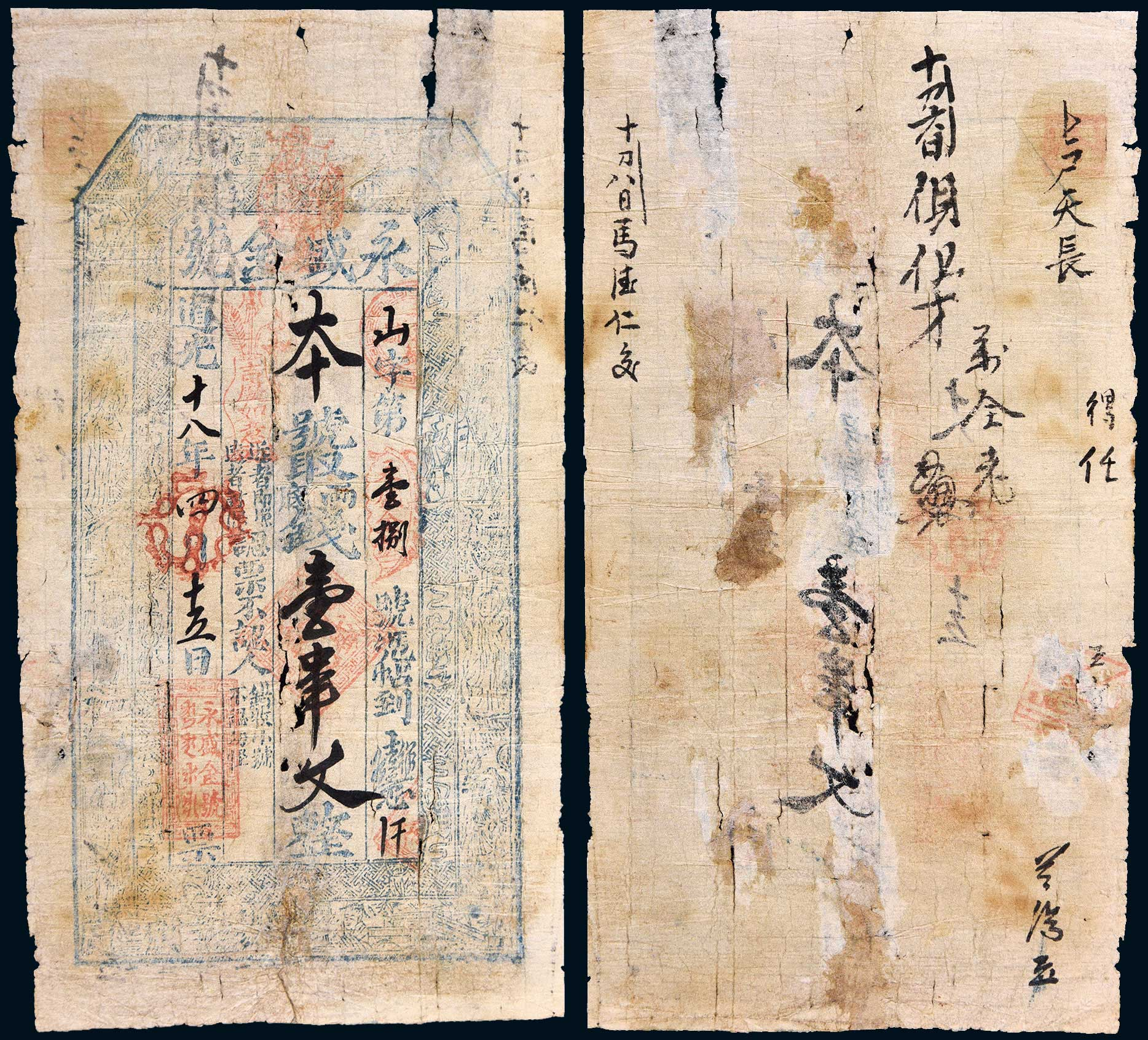
A Chinese zhuangpiao banknote of 1 chuàn wén (串文) by the Yong Sheng Jin Money Shop in the year 1838 during the Qing dynasty.

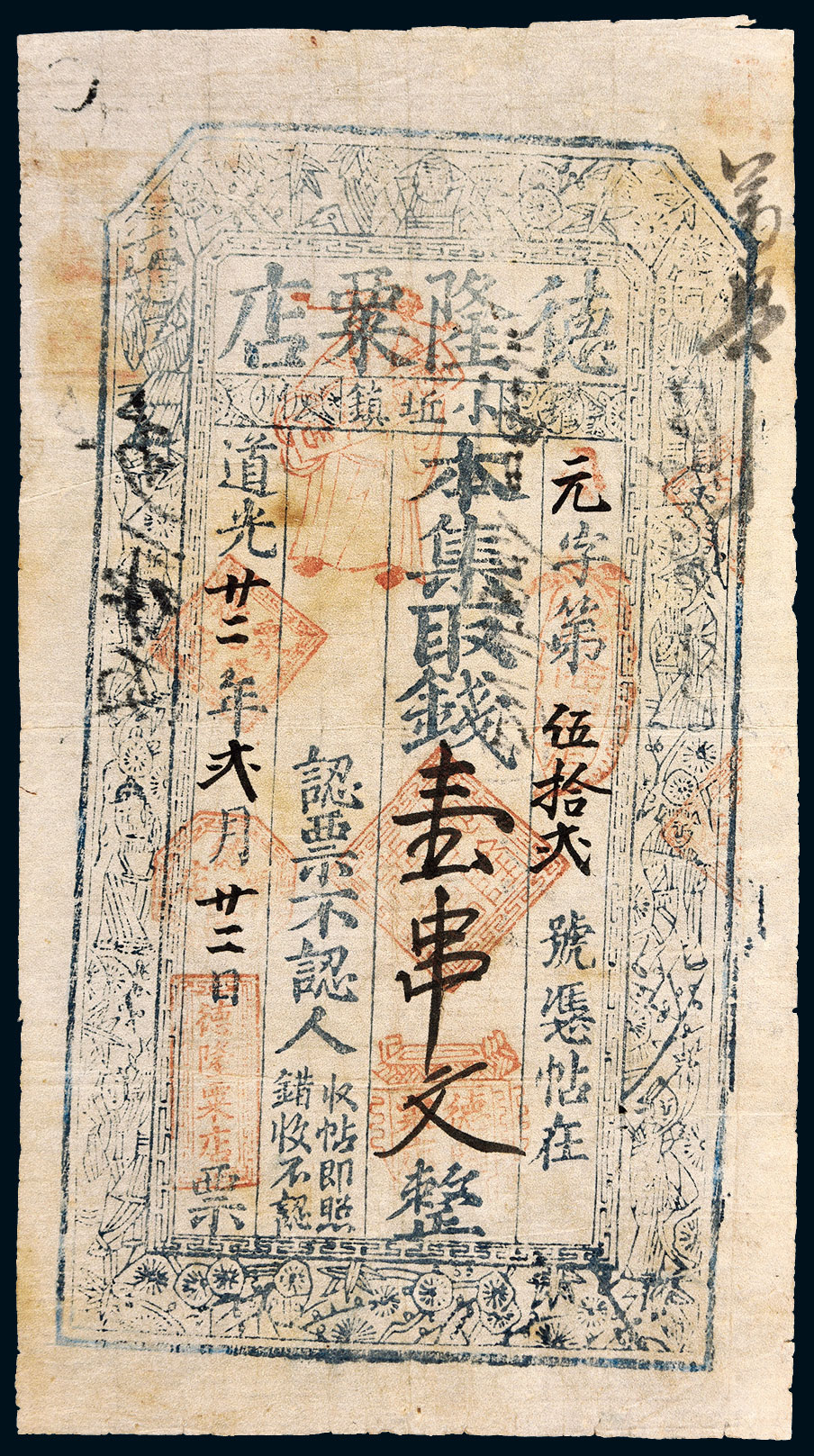
A Chinese zhuangpiao banknote of 1 chuàn wén (串文) by the De Long Su Dian in the year 1842 during the Qing dynasty.

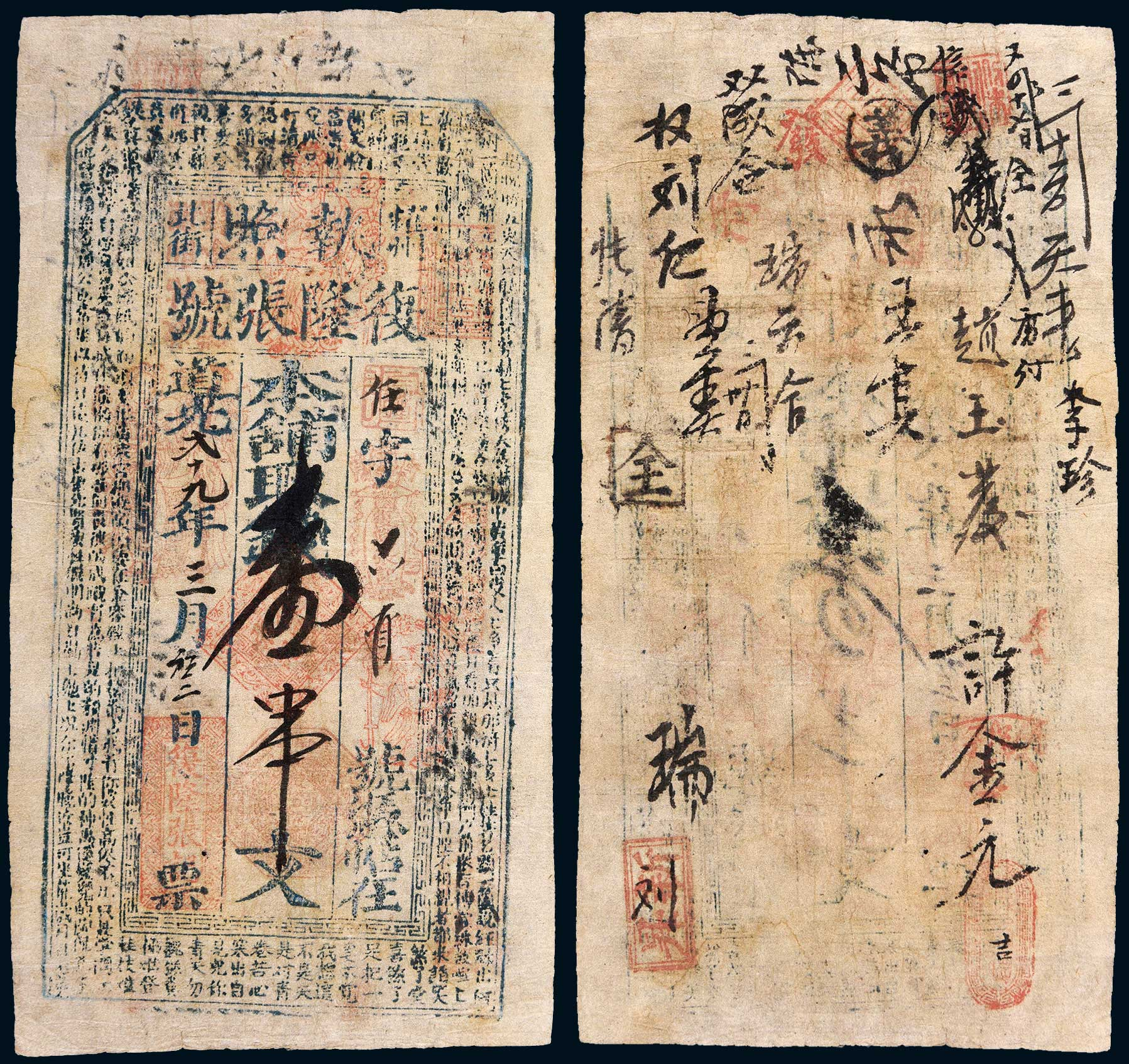
A Chinese zhuangpiao banknote of 1 chuàn wén (串文) by the Fulong Zhang Money Shop in the year 1849 during the Qing dynasty.

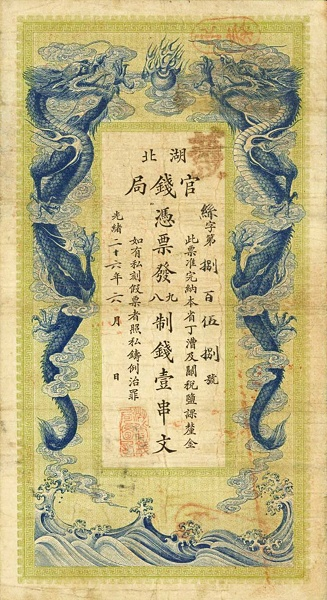
A Chinese provincial banknote (Hubei Guanpiao) of chuàn wén (串文) by the Hupeh Provincial Bank in the year 1900 during the Qing dynasty.

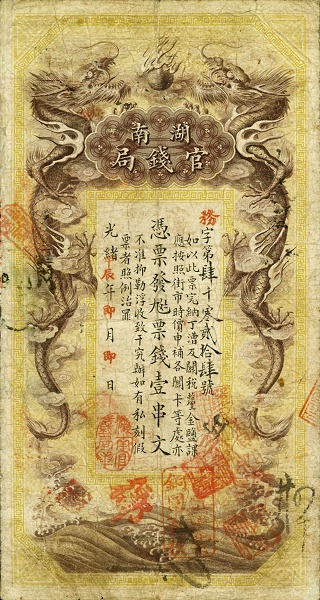
A Chinese provincial banknote of chuàn wén (串文) by the Hunan Provincial Bank in the year 1904 during the Qing dynasty.

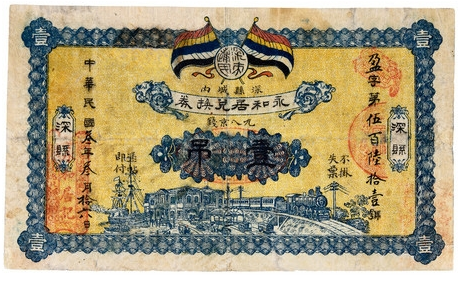
A Chinese zhuangpiao banknote of 1 tiao (吊) or 98 Jingqian cash coins (京錢) issued by the Yonghe Residence Co., Ltd. in 1914.

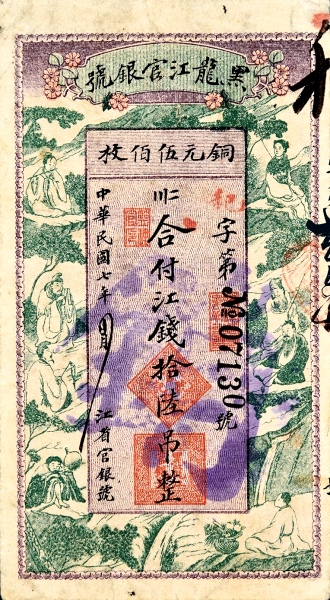
A Chinese banknote of 16 tiao (吊) or 500 coppers (枚) issued by the Hio Lung Kiang Government Bank in 1918.

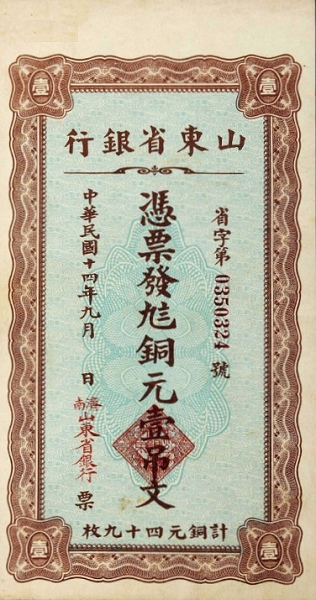
A Chinese banknote of 1 tiao (吊) or 49 copper cents (枚) issued by the Provincial Bank of Shantung in 1925.

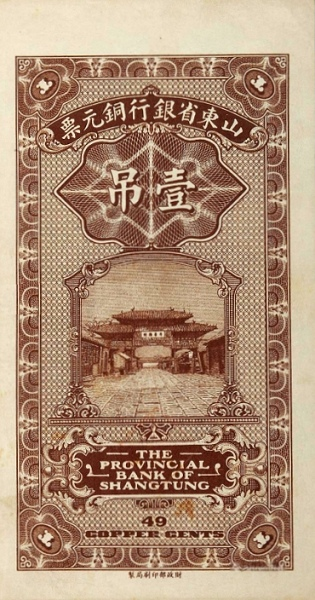
A Chinese banknote of 1 tiao (吊) or 49 copper cents (枚) issued by the Provincial Bank of Shantung in 1925.

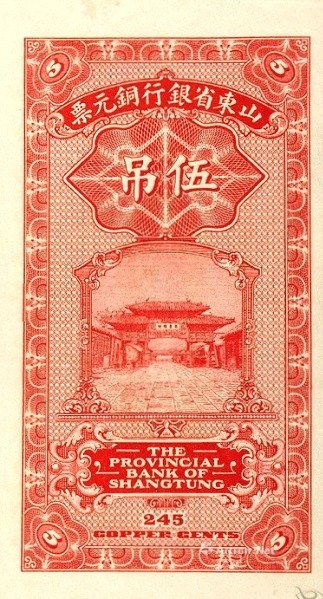
A Chinese banknote of 5 tiao (吊) or 245 copper cents (枚) issued by the Provincial Bank of Shantung in 1925.

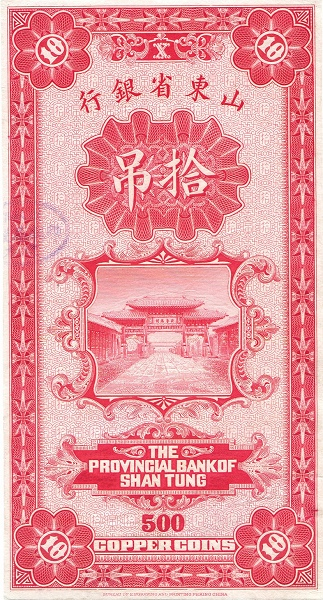
A Chinese banknote of 10 tiao (吊) or 500 copper cents (枚) issued by the Provincial Bank of Shantung in 1926. Note how the number of cash coins in a string gets progressively less based on how many strings the banknote is worth, though 10 of the 1 tiao notes would only be worth 490 copper cents.

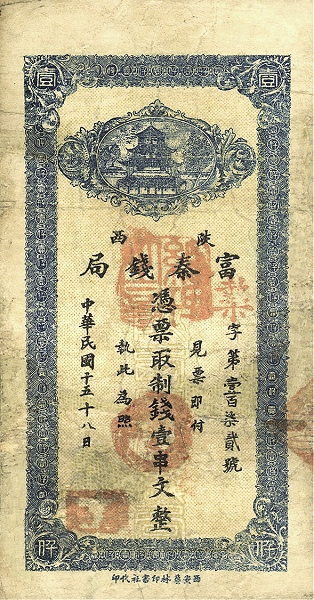
A Chinese banknote of 1 chuàn wén (串文) by the Fu Ching Chien Chü Shensi in 1926.

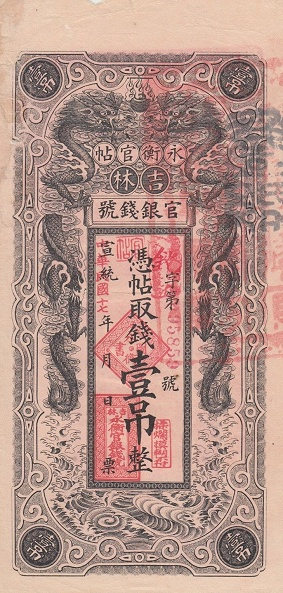
A Chinese banknote of 1 tiao (吊) issued by the Kirin Yung Heng Provincial Bank in the year 1928. Note that this banknote was printed during the reign of the Qing Xuantong Emperor but was re-issued under the Republic.

== Slang names ==
In early 20th century Sơn Tây Province slang, the term for a string of cash coins was Lòi. Meanwhile, in the late 19th century Điêm slang spoken by the lower-class people of Saigon, the terms were Què and Quẻ as an abbreviation of Quán (貫).

== Sources ==
- Hartill, David (2005). Cast Chinese Coins: A Historical Catalogue. Trafford. ISBN 978-1-4120-5466-9.
- Wilkinson, Endymion, Chinese History: A Manual (Revised and Enlarged). Harvard-Yenching Institute Monograph Series, 52. Harvard University Asia Center. 2000.
- Akin, Marjorie H, James C Bard, and Kevin Akin. "Asian Coins in North America." In Numismatic Archaeology of North America, 1st ed., 65–81. United Kingdom: Routledge, 2016.
- Akin, Marjorie Kleiger. "The Noncurrency Functions of Chinese Wen in America." Historical Archaeology 26, no. 2 (1992): 58–65. doi:10.1007/BF03373533
- Trombert, Eric. "The Demise of Silk on the Silk Road: Textiles as Money at Dunhuang from the Late Eighth Century to the Thirteenth Century." Journal of the Royal Asiatic Society 23, no. 2 (2013): 327–47. doi:10.1017/S1356186313000229.
- Scheidel, Walter. "Coin Quality, Coin Quantity, and Coin Value in Early China and the Roman World." American Journal of Numismatics (1989) 22 (2010): 93–118.
