= Guanzi (currency) =

Song-era Chinese form of paper money

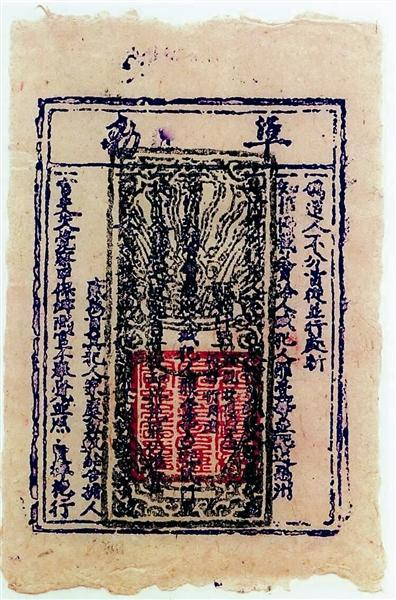
A modern reproduction of a guanzi banknote.

The guanzi (simplified Chinese: 关子; traditional Chinese: 關子; pinyin: guān zi), was a Song dynasty era form of paper money that served as promissory notes that could be traded for goods and services where the seller that received these notes could go to an issuing agency and redeem the note for strings of coins at a small exchange fee. They were originally introduced as a form of payment to the military at which time the notes were known as jianqian guanzi (見錢關子), and circulated alongside the contemporary jiaozi and huizi notes. After 1190 the records stop mentioning guanzi notes until 1264, an indication that jiaozi and huizi notes had superseded the guanzi in importance. From 1264 new guanzi notes were introduced such as the copper backed tongqian guanzi (銅錢關子), the silver backed yinguan (銀關), and the gold backed jinyin jianqian guanzi (金銀見錢關子), which were all introduced to combat the inflationary policy that had plagued the Huizi. The exchange rate between guanzi banknotes and copper cash coins was 1 guàn for 770 wén while huizi notes of the eighteenth production period were valued at 3 guàn for 1 wén. Despite these exchange rates the new guanzi banknotes did not stop the inflation that had plagued the Southern Song dynasty during its waning years. In the modern era not a single guanzi note survived regardless of the fact that many of them produced during the Southern Song era, in the modern era only the printing plates that were used to produce guanzi notes still exist and of the ten printing plates created by the Song government a total six are owned by the Administration Institute of Cultural Relics of Dongzhi County, two guanzi printing plates are in a private collection, and two of the printing plates have yet to be found.

There were 5 different denominations of guanzi notes.

== History ==
During the Tang dynasty there was a form of promissory notes known as jindai guanzi (金帶關子) that were exclusively exchanged between the nobility but became a more common form of currency over time as the transportation of large strings of copper cash coins was considered troublesome as they were heavy. During the Southern Song dynasty the military were paid in guanzi banknotes that could be converted into cash coins at a fee of 10 wén per guàn. The guanzi notes mostly circulated in and around the capital city of Lin'an and were specifically made for Wuzhounese tea merchants.

Members of the court sought to discourage the introduction of the Sichuanese Jiaozi because it wasn't backed by copper coins in sufficient numbers like the guanzi were, which is why after 1131 the guanzi, alongside the Huizi, would remain the paramount form of paper money in Southeast China. The central government had issued a number of guanzi valued at 800,000 mín in 1159 which were planned to expire and be replaced after 3 years. The region of Huaidong had only printed 400,000 mín in guanzi that were referred to as Gongju (公據) in 1159 but these already expired after 2 years.

Around 1264, there were 20,000,000 guanzi in circulation.

== Sources ==
- Li Ting (李埏) (1992). "Guanzi (關子)", in Zhongguo da baike quanshu (中國大百科全書), Zhongguo lishi (中國歷史) (Beijing/Shanghai: Zhongguo da baike quanshu chubanshe), Vol. 1, 265. (in Mandarin Chinese)
- Zhou Fazeng (周發增), Chen Longtao (陳隆濤), Qi Jixiang (齊吉祥), ed. (1998). Zhongguo gudai zhengzhi zhidu shi cidian (中國古代政治制度史辭典) (Beijing: Shoudu shifan daxue chubanshe), 367. (in Mandarin Chinese)

== See also ==
- Economy of the Song dynasty
