= Paper money seal (China) =

Historical anti-counterfeiting measure

A Yuan dynasty government note and its matrix. The Mongolian dynasty used 'Phags-pa script, Tibetan originated writing, beside hanzi at this time.

A cash seal (simplified Chinese: 宝钞印; traditional Chinese: 寳鈔印; pinyin: Baochao Yin; "Baochao" means "valuable money", "Yin" means "seal") is a type of seal used as an anti-counterfeiting measure on paper money. The cash seal first appeared during the Song dynasty in China.

The short name is Chao Yin (simplified Chinese: 钞印; traditional Chinese: 鈔印), and the full name is Seal of Baochao (simplified Chinese: 宝钞之印; traditional Chinese: 寳鈔之印; pinyin: Baochao Zhiyin), or Baochao Yinjian (simplified Chinese: 宝钞印鉴; traditional Chinese: 寳鈔印鑑). The name can also be simply translated as "money seal" or "note seal".

== History ==
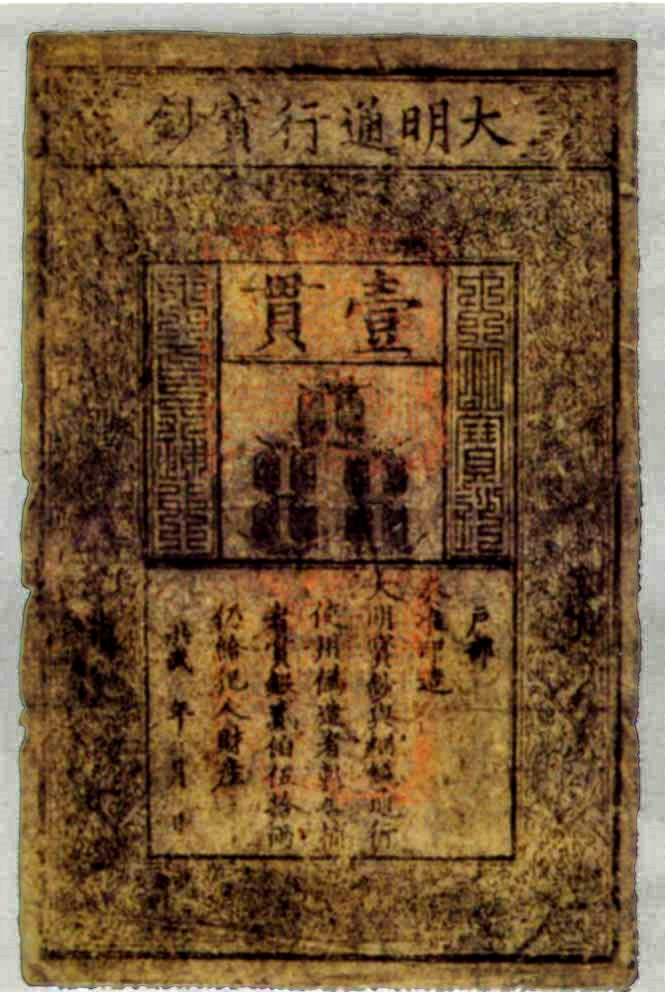
A Ming dynasty government note with two seal stamps in the centre.

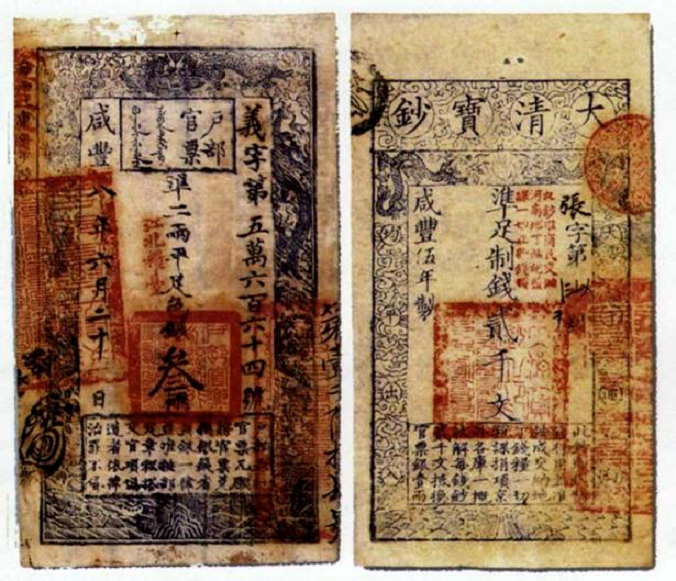
Qing dynasty notes. In the centre of the left note is the Seal of Cash of the Great Qing (大清宝钞之印).

The economy of China during the Song dynasty outpaced the supply of traditional coinage, leading the government to issue paper money (Jiaozi (交子)) to increase the money supply. Subsequently, a government department was created to manage cash affairs, with its responsibilities including producing and issuing cash, and combating counterfeiting. The cash seal was developed as an anti-counterfeiting measure; official government notes received a red, sometimes black or purple, stamp at their centres. This forced counterfeiters to attempt to replicate the seal, presumably leading to distinguishable lower quality stamps. Severe punishments, including the death penalty, were given to counterfeiters.

The Ming and Qing dynasties also stamped notes. The Ming government department responsible for cash affairs and the use of the cash seal was the Baochao Bureau (simplified Chinese: 宝钞局; traditional Chinese: 寳鈔局; pinyin: Baochao Ju).

== Modern time ==
The use of cash seals is no longer restricted to governments. Seals or private individuals and organizations may be used in the same manner on private notes to represent the parties' trust, credit, or authority.

In the era of the Republic of China, these seal stamps could also be called Yinhang Yin (銀行印/银行印; direct translation: the seal stamp of bank, or just "bank seal").

In Japan, ginkō-in (Japanese: 銀行印) seals have similar functions.

In Singapore, a seal has been present in all Singapore dollar banknotes since its first series, bearing the chairman of the Monetary Authority of Singapore (MAS) or the Board of Commissioners of Currency, Singapore (BCCS).

== Typical seals ==
In late imperial China:

- 大明寳鈔之印 / 大明宝钞之印 (traditional/simplified Chinese); The Seal of Cash of the Great Ming.
- 大清寳鈔之印 / 大清宝钞之印; The Seal of Cash of the Great Qing.

== See also ==
- Seal (East Asia)
- Banknote
- Cash
- Economy of the Song dynasty
