= Chinese cash (currency unit) =

Chinese currency unit in imperial China

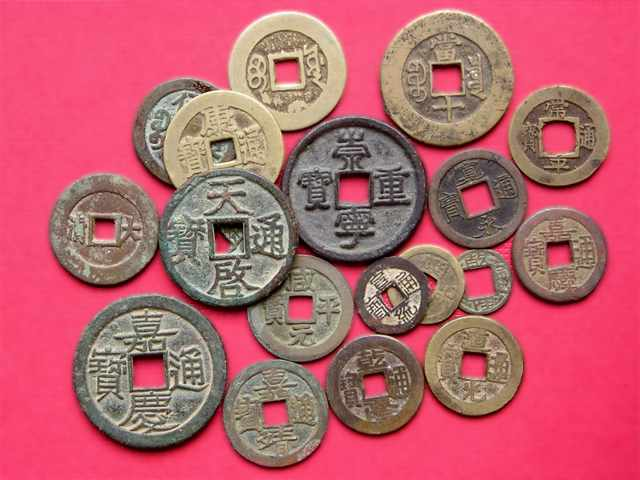
Coins of Imperial China (Song through Qing dynasties) and some similar Japanese and Korean coins

Chinese cash (Chinese: 文; pinyin: wén) was a currency denomination used in China in imperial times. It was the chief denomination until the introduction of the yuan in the late 19th century.

== Etymology ==
The English word "cash", meaning "tangible currency", is an older word from Portuguese caixa or Middle French caisse ("box", or "case"). The term was first used on coins issued in Guangdong Province in 1900. It did not appear on paper money until later. The plural forms "cash" and "cashes" were both used. The Chinese character wen (Chinese: 文; pinyin: wén) has several other meanings in modern Chinese.

== History ==
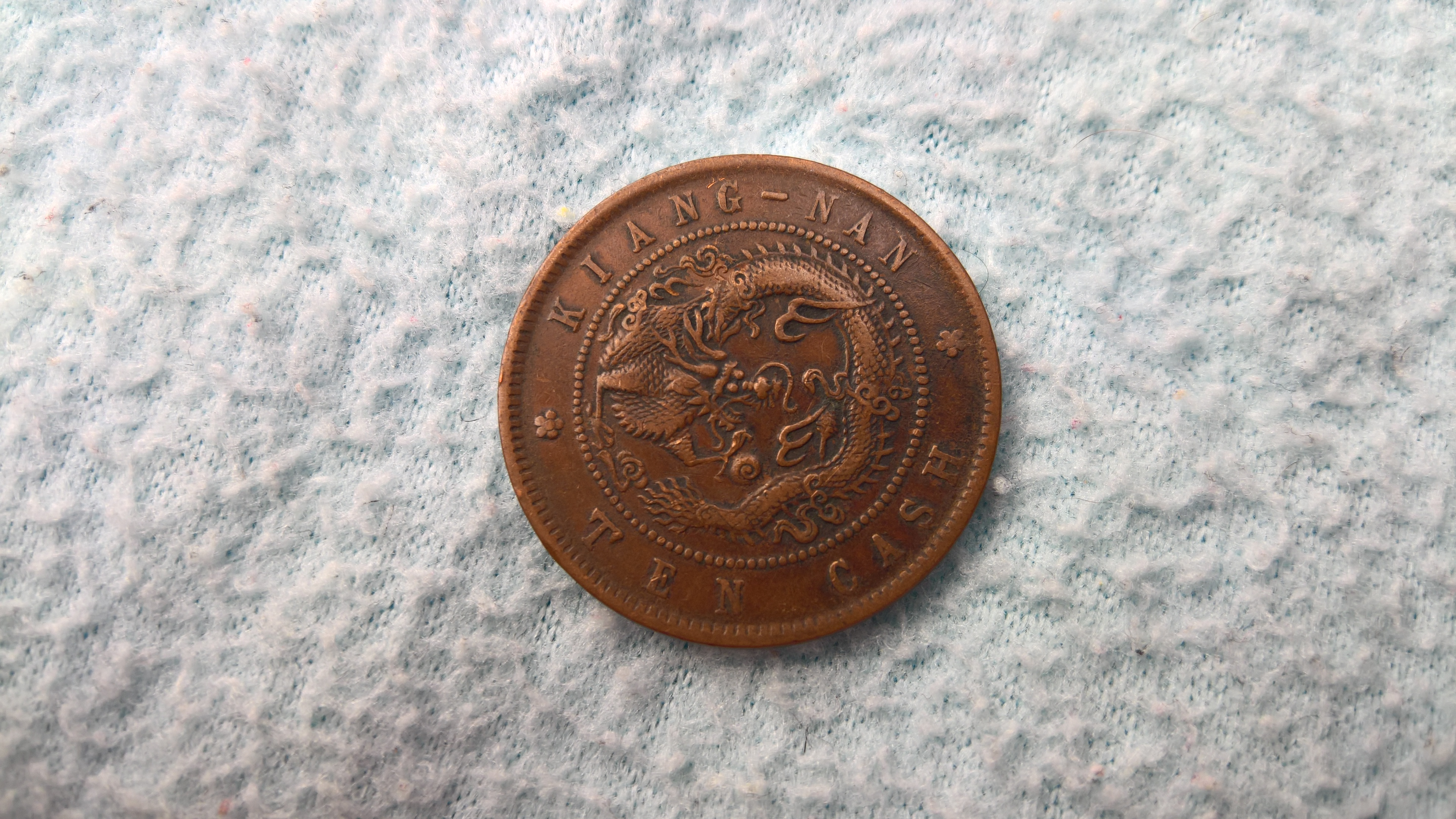
A Guāng Xù Yuán Bǎo (光緒元寶) coin of 10 cash

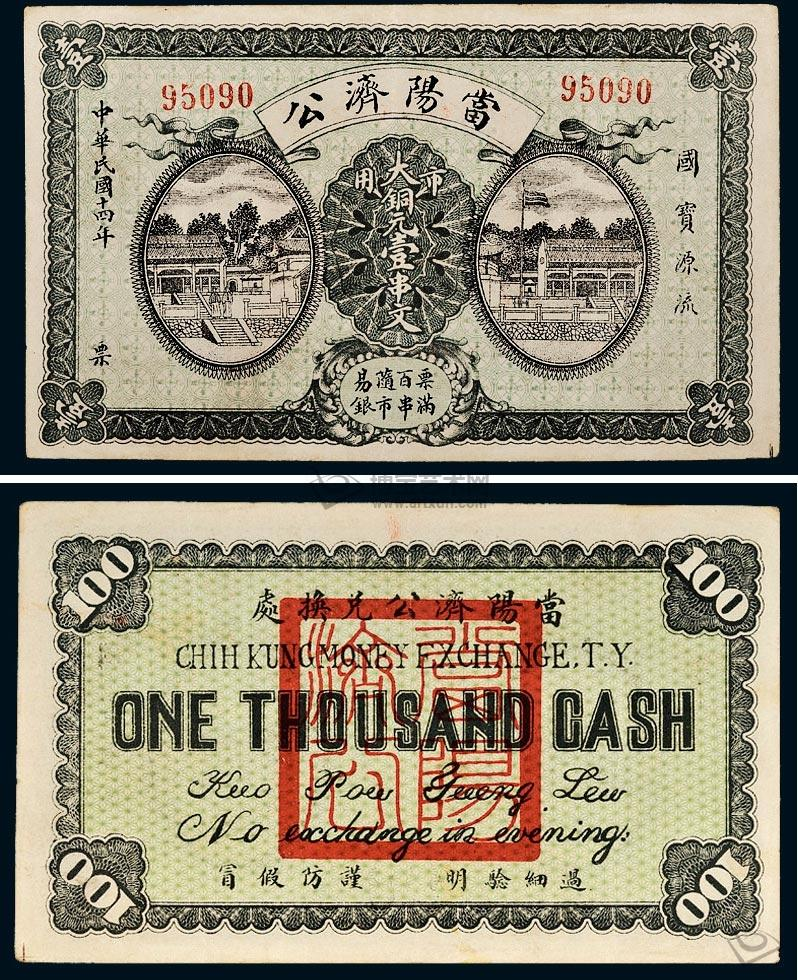
A banknote of 1 chuàn (串, a string of cash coins) or 1000 cash

The wen was one of the chief units of currency in China and was used to denominate both coins and paper money. Other denominations were used, including various weights, based on the tael system, for sycee silver and gold ingots. Chinese currency started 3000–4500 years ago but no one is quite sure.

Until the 19th century, coins denominated in wen were cast, the most common formation being the round-shaped copper coin with a square or circular hole in the centre. The hole enabled the coins to be strung together to create higher denominations, as was frequently done due to the coin's low value. The number of coins in a string of cash (simplified Chinese: 一贯钱; traditional Chinese: 一貫錢; pinyin: yīguàn qián) varied over time and place but was nominally 1000. A string of 1000 wén was supposed to be equal in value to one tael (liǎng) of pure silver. Each string of cash was divided in ten sections of 100. The person who strung the cash into a string took one, two, or three cash per hundred, depending on local custom, as payment for his effort. So, in fact, an ounce of silver could vary in exchange from 970 to 990 cash (or more) between two places fairly close together. In places in the North where there was a shortage of coinage a string of 500 exchanged for an ounce of silver. Paper money sometimes showed pictures of the appropriate number of 1 wén coins strung together.

In the 19th century, foreign coins began to circulate widely in China, particularly silver coins such as the Mexican peso. In 1889, Chinese currency began to be denominated in the yuan and its subdivisions. The cash or wén was retained in this system as 1/1000 yuan. Traditional style, cast 1 wén coins continued to be produced until the end of the Chinese Empire in 1911. The last coins denominated in cash were struck in the early years of the Republic of China in 1924.

The term is still used today in colloquial Cantonese (mān), but written as 蚊 to represent Hong Kong dollars.

== Coins ==
Numerous authorities issued coins denominated in wén in the nineteenth century, including departments of the Imperial government (The Board of Revenue and Board of Public Works) together with provincial authorities. Most coins were 1 wén denominations, but denominations of 4, 5, 10, 50, 100, 200, 500 and 1000 wén were also issued. After the introduction of the yuan, coins were struck in denominations of 1, 2, 5, 10 and 20 cash or wén.

== Paper money ==
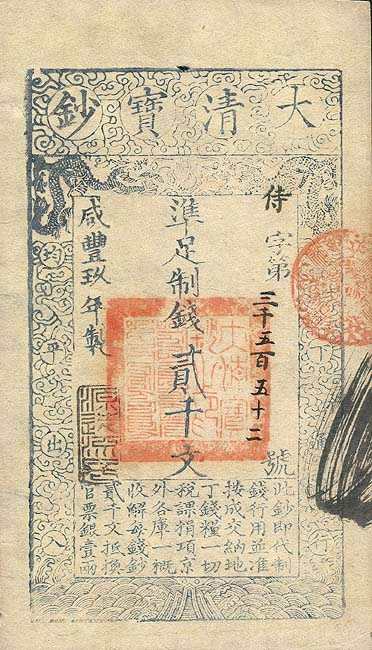
A 2000 wén Great Qing Treasure Note banknote from 1859

The world's first paper money, issued in China between the 7th and 15th centuries, was denominated in wén. The notes carried depictions of coins, sometimes in strings of ten. The notes of the Yuan dynasty suffered from hyperinflation due to over production without sufficient coins to back them and were withdrawn. Chinese paper money reappeared in the 19th century during the Qing dynasty. In 1853, Great Qing Treasure Note banknotes were introduced in denominations of 500, 1000 and 2000 wén. 5000 wén notes followed in 1856, with 10,000, 50,000 and 100,000 wén notes added in 1857. The last of these notes were issued in 1859.

== External influence ==
Early Korean, Japanese, Ryukyuan, and Vietnamese currencies, the Korean mun, Japanese mon, Ryukyuan mon, and Vietnamese văn (where it was both used for cash coins and as a currency unit), were derived from the Chinese wén and written with the same character. In 1695, the Shogunate placed the character gen (元) on the obverse of copper coins. Vietnam gained independence from China in 938 and merely carried on the tradition of using cash. The first Vietnamese cash was issued in 968.

== Hong Kong ==
The smallest unit of the Hong Kong dollar during the 1860s was the mil, which like the Chinese cash was 1/1000 of a dollar. The Chinese character for this currency unit was "文", though these coins were not translated into English as "cash".

== See also ==
- Ancient Chinese coinage
- History of Chinese currency
- Japanese mon
- Korean mun
- Vietnamese văn (coins)
- Vietnamese văn (currency unit)
- Ryukyuan mon
