= Hongqian =

Chinese numismatic term

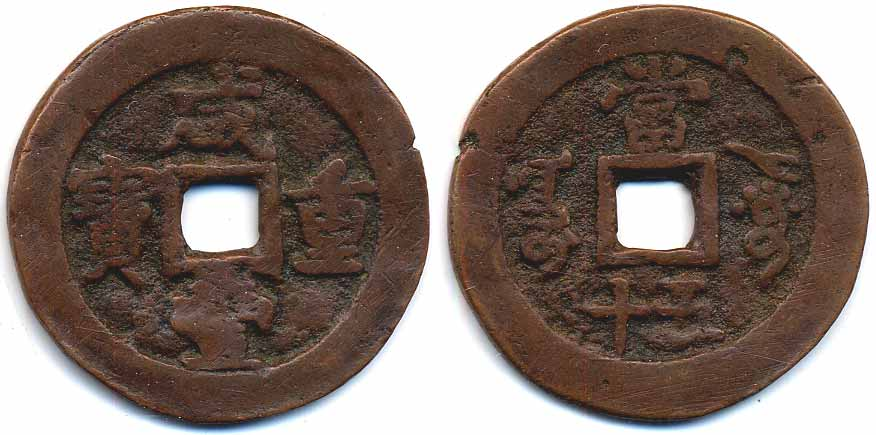
A Xianfeng Zhongbao (咸豐重寶) "Red cash coin" produced by the Aksu mint under the reign of the Xianfeng Emperor.

"Red cash coins" (traditional Chinese: 紅錢; simplified Chinese: 红钱; pinyin: hóng qián; French: Sapèques rouges; Uyghur: قىزىل پۇل) are the cash coins produced in Xinjiang under Qing rule following the conquest of the Dzungar Khanate by the Qing dynasty in 1757. While in Northern Xinjiang the monetary system of China proper, with standard cash coins, was adopted in Southern Xinjiang where the pūl (ﭘول) coins of Dzungaria circulated earlier, the pūl-system was continued but some of the old Dzungar pūl coins were melted down to make Qianlong Tongbao (乾隆通寶) cash coins. Because pūl coins were usually around 98% copper, they tended to be very red in colour which gave the cash coins based on the pūl coins the nickname "red cash coins".

Because of their high steel content, "red cash coins" were usually valued at 10 wén a piece, but at times were only valued at 5 wén.

== History ==
The various mints and cash coin systems of Xinjiang under the Qing dynasty, with Zhiqian circulating in the north and Hongqian circulating in the south.

=== Qianlong era ===
In July 1758, General Zhao Hui petitioned to the Qianlong Emperor to reclaim the old pūl coins and use them as scrap for the production of new cash coins. These "red cash coins" had an official exchange rate with the pūl coins that remained in circulation of 1 "red cash" for 2 pūl coins. Zhao Hui wanted the new cash coins to have the same weight as pūl coins (they weighed 2 qián) and had both a higher width and thickness than regular cash coins. Red cash coins are also generally marked by their rather crude craftsmanship when compared to the cash coins of China proper. The edges of these coins are often not filed completely and the casting technique is often inaccurate or the inscriptions on them seemed deformed.

Xinjiang already had a rich history of its own Chinese-style coinage and red cash coins are a continuation of this history.

At the introduction of the red cash system in Southern Xinjiang in 1760, the exchange rate of standard cash (or "yellow cash") and "red cash" was set at 10 standard cash coins to 1 "red cash coin". During the two or three subsequent years this exchange rate was decreased to 5:1. When used in the Northern or Eastern circuits of Xinjiang, the "red cash coins" were considered equal in value to the standard cash coins that circulated there. The areas where the Dzungar pūls had most circulated, such as Yarkant, Hotan, and Kashgar, were the sites of mints operated by the Qing government. As the official mint of the Dzungar Khanate was in the city of Yarkent, the Qing used this mint to cast the new "red cash coins" and new mints were established in Aksu and Ili. As the Jiaqing Emperor ordered that 10% of all cash coins cast in Xinjiang should bear the inscription "Qianlong Tongbao" the majority of "red cash coins" with this inscription were actually produced after the Qianlong era as their production lasted until the fall of the Qing dynasty in 1911, making many of them hard to attribute.

During the Qianlong era, mints in Xinjiang were established in Yili (伊犁), Yerkant (يارﻛﻨﺪ), Aksu (اﻗﺴﻮ), and Uši (اﺷﻲ), and probably also in Khotan (خوتن), Kashgar (قاش), and Qarashahr.

The first mint to be opened in Xinjiang under Qing rule was the Yarkant mint. At first, 500,000 cash coins were cast from melted down pūl coins. The Yarkant mint ceased production in the year 1767, but re-opened in 1768. In the year 1769, the Yarkant mint was transferred to the Uqturpan mint. While the city changed its name from Yerkim to Yarkant in September 1761, there is no evidence that the mint mark was also changed at the same time. In the beginning, the Manchu form of the Yarkant was Yerdjim and were issued from 1759 to 1761; afterwards, the Manchu form was Yerdjiang.

In the year 1766 the Aksu mint was ordered by the government to transfer its manufacturing to the city of Uqturpan. Cash coins were to be produced under the regulations of the Yarkant mint with a standard weight of 2 qián (7.5 grams). It was further ordered to include a mint mark in both Manchu and Arabic scripts. In the year 1771, the government memorialised that cash coins produced in Xinjiang be reduced in weight. While originally having a weight of 2 qián, because the cities of Aksu, Uqturpan, Yarkant, and Kashgar had population numbers that were increasing, it meant that cash coins were unable to circulate freely as they had become more scarce relative to an increasing population. Uqturpan was ordered to reduce the weight of their cash coins by 5 fēn, which meant that they would weigh 1.5 qián (or 5.6 grams). The surplus of copper was then used to make more cash coins to help reduce the scarcity of money. In the year 1774, the weight of cash coins produced by the Uqturpan weight was reduced again to 1.2 qián (4.5 grams). In the year 1798, the Uqrurpan mint was transferred back to the Aksu mint.

=== Jiaqing era ===
In the year 1801, the government of the Qing dynasty set the quota on the copper to be collected in the southern circuit of Xinjiang to 21,100 jin. Of this copper, a total of 2,600 strings of pūl cash coins were to be manufactured. Each of these cash coins were set to have a weight of 1.2 qián.

=== Daoguang era ===
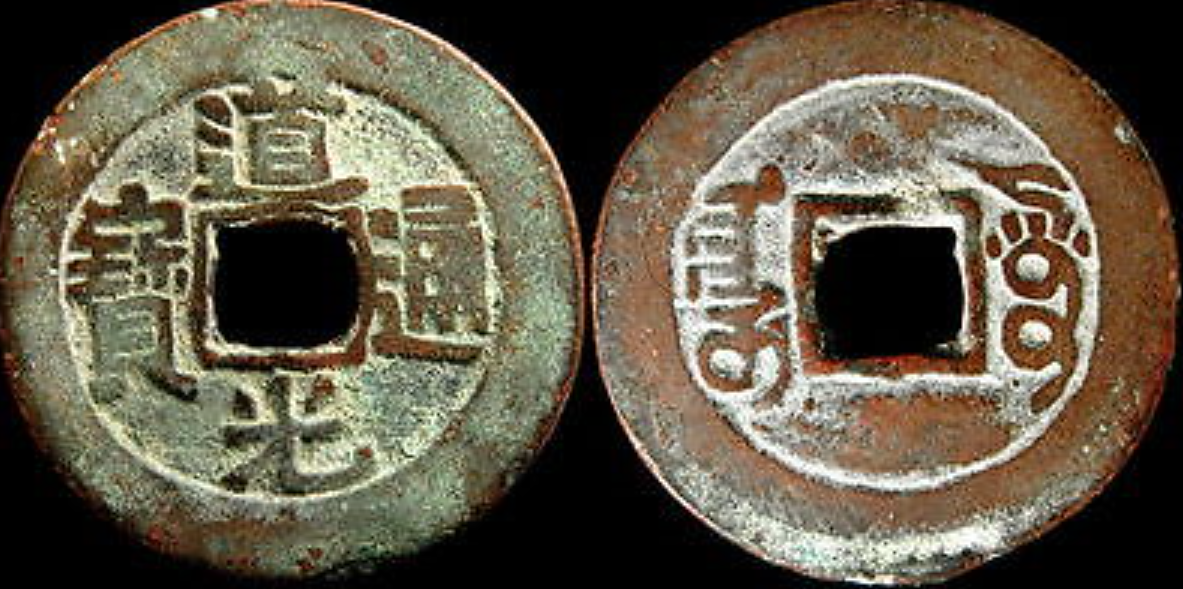
A "Red cash coin" produced by the Aksu mint under the reign of the Daoguang Emperor.

In 1826, Jahangir Khoja, with soldiers from the Khanate of Kokand, occupied the southern circuit of Xinjiang, temporarily losing Kashgar, Yarkant, and Hotän to this rebellion. The Daoguang Emperor sent 36,000 Manchu soldiers to defeat this rebellion. As more soldiers had entered Xinjiang, the price of silver went down while that of copper went up. In 1826, 1 tael of silver was worth 250 or 260 "Red Cash" while in 1827, it had decreased to 100 or sometimes even as low as 80. Despite the soldiers returning to Manchuria, the original exchange rates did not restore, causing the mint of Aksu to close. As the Aksu mint closed down, less money was circulating on the market.

The 10 wén Aksu cash coins were introduced in 1828 because of a money shortage that caused the government to be unable to pay the soldiers stationed in the region. These cash coins only weighed 1 qián 5 fēn. In the year 1829, the government introduced the 5 wén denomination of "red cash coins".

In 1828, monetary reforms were implemented to keep the current weight of "Red Cash" but increase their denominations to 5, and 10 wén (while weighing the same) with 70% of Aksu's annual production being 5 wén coins, and 30% being 10 wén. But the production of "Red Cash" itself was reduced by two-and-a-half-thousand strings. Later, the Daoguang Emperor ordered the weight of "Red Cash" to further decrease in order to maximise profits.

In reality, the 5 wén "red cash coins" circulated as 1 wén cash coins while the 10 wén "red cash coins" circulated as 2 wén cash coins. Furthermore, the Chinese character "十" was used by the people as a mark of authenticity rather than an indication of the cash coin's denomination.

=== Xianfeng era ===
Under the reign of the Xianfeng Emperor, "Red Cash" coins were excessively manufactured, negating the reforms implemented by the Daoguang Emperor and causing inflation in the region. As the Taiping Rebellion and the Second Opium War had prompted the Qing government to start issuing high denomination cash coins in other parts of the Qing dynasty, this soon spread to Xinjiang mainly due to the decreased subsidies for military expenditures in Xinjiang lowering the soldiers' salaries.

In the year 1853, the production of large denomination cash coins commenced at the Kucha Mint. These "red cash coins" were produced using local weight standards and not the ones set by the Ministry of Revenue because of their high copper content. In the year 1855, new denominations of 4 wén and 8 wén were introduced at the Yining mint. Furthermore, the Ürümqi mint started issuing cash coins with high denominations in response. New mints were established at Kucha and Kashgar while the Yarkant mint was re-opened. Coins also started being cast in bronze, brass, lead, and iron; this system received a chaotic response from Xinjiang's market. The Xianfeng era "red cash coins" produced at the Kashgar mint contain an obscure vertically written vorm of Arabic script.

In the year 1859, the 50 wén and 100 wén cash coins were officially discontinued. The Kucha mint then started collecting them for re-casting into 10 wén Daqian, a single string of either denomination could produce 3 strings of 10 wén Daqian.

From 1860, denominations higher than 10 wén were discontinued.

=== Tongzhi era ===
Only coins of 4 wén, 5 wén, and 10 wén were cast at Xinjiang's provincial mints under the Tongzhi Emperor. Cash coins that had a higher denomination than 10 wén were being collected from the population to be smelted into lower denominations, while the higher denominations that stayed on the market were accepted but only lower than their face value.

In the year 1866, the city of Ili was conquered by Mu'azzam Khan, which was followed by a Russian occupation of the region in 1871. During this era, the Russian ruble started circulating in the region but after the region was returned to the Qing, the Ili Mint would never produce any cash coins ever again. The production of Tongzhi Tongbao (同治通寶) cash coins would completely stop in the region following the loss of the cities which hosted the provincial mints during the Dungan uprisings.

=== Arabic cash coins of Rashidin Khan Khoja ===
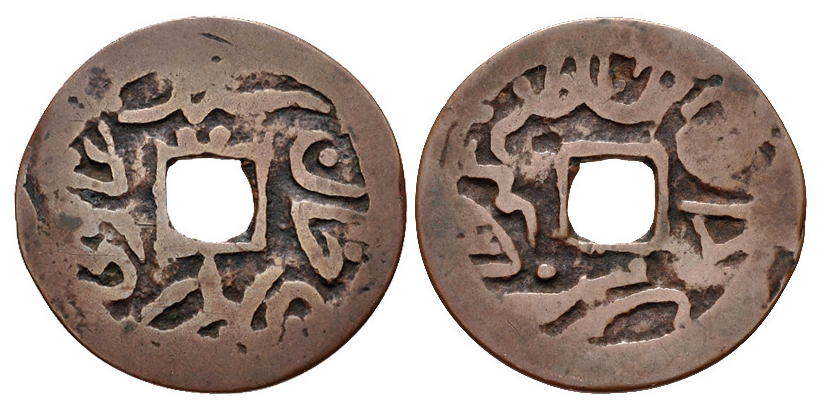
Coinage of Rashidin Khoja. Kucha mint. Dually dated AH 1281 and RY 2 (AD 1864). Obverse legend: Said Ghazi Rashidin Khan. Ithneen in Arabic. Reverse: Zarb dar al-sultanat Kuqa, 1281 in Arabic

During the Dungan revolt from 1862 to 1877, Sultan Rashidin Khan Khoja proclaimed a Jihad against the Qing dynasty in 1862, and captured large cities in the Tarim Basin. It stretched from Turfan in the east to Yarkand in the west. He issued Chinese-style cash coins minted at the Aksu and Kucha mints with exclusive Arabic inscriptions. These coins were only briefly minted as Rashidin Khan Khoja would be betrayed and murdered by Yakub beg in 1867.

=== Guangxu era ===
As the chaotic circulation of various denominations of cash coins had continued, this invited foreign silver money from Central Asia to start circulating in the Xinjiang region. After the Russian Empire had occupied the northern region of Xinjiang in 1871, Russian rubles started circulating. Eventually, 3 parallel currency systems were in place while pūl coins from the Dzungar Khanate kept circulating in Kashgaria a century after the region was annexed by the Qing dynasty. The Dungan revolt led by the Tajik Muhammad Yaqub Beg was defeated in 1878 during the Qing reconquest of Xinjiang, and the Russians returned the territory they had occupied after signing a treaty in 1880 at Yining.

The Kucha Mint was reopened following the Manchu reconquest of Xinjiang in the year 1878. The initial casting from the Kucha mint wasn't of a high standard. A memorial about the Kucha mint issued during the 6th month of the 11th year of the Guangxu Emperor (July 1885) notes that on the 26th day of the 7th month, twenty mint employees from the 78 that were originally employed by the Kucha were to be detached for the establishment of a small fire furnace that would chiefly be used for the production of cash coin patterns. 500 cash coins made up a gua, which reportedly weighed 4 catties and 1 tael, with each cash coin weighing 1 qián 3 fēn. Of these cash coins, 40% were produced with the inscription Qianlong Tongbao, while the other 60% used the Guangxu-era name. The reverse side of these cash coins featured both Manchu and Arabic script, and additionally, also used the Chinese character "阿" (ā) to further indicate the mint of production, while on the bottom of the reverse side of these cash coins is the Chinese character "十" (shí). The character "十" was placed on them because what the Qing government described as the "turbaned people" did not accept the cash coins at their value without the written denomination being "當十" (dāng shí). The "turbaned people", as described in the memorial, suspected that these cash coins weren't genuine government-produced cash coins and were often unwilling to use them. In some of the four old Western cities, some cash coins that did not have the Chinese characters "當十" were only accepted at half a cash coin and they were usually used as change.

In the year 1884, Xinjiang was upgraded to the status of "province", ending military and Lifan Yuan rule over the region, while the "Red Cash" system was reintroduced in Kashgaria but now at a value of 4 wén. However, at the end of the reign of the Guangxu Emperor, "Red Cash" was discontinued at the Aksu mint in 1892 because of the rising costs of charcoal needed to produce the coins. The Aksu mint was transferred to the Kucha mint. Though the Kashgar mint re-opened in 1888, it outsourced some of the production of "Red Cash" to Kucha and Aksu, resulting in cash coins being cast with the Chinese mint mark of Kashgar but the Manchu and Arabic mint marks of the actual mint of casting.

In the year 1889, the casting of 2,290 strings was established at the Kashgar Mint; a total of 29 employees were required for this process. In the year 1893, the government set up a combined Mines and Minting Office in the east corner of the barracks of the native city of Kashgar. Furthermore, the annual casting rate was increased to 6,400 strings, and the mint now employed 50 employees.

In the year 1890, the government of the Qing dynasty decided that "red cash coins" should circulate in both southern and northern Xinjiang and that they were to be equivalent of 1.2 qián or 1.0 qián standard cash coins of the time.

During the Guangxu era, "red cash coins" with the "Boo Ciowan" (ᠪᠣᠣ
ᠴᡳᠣᠸᠠᠨ) mint marks were produced in Xinjiang, but these cash coins were not produced by the Ministry of Revenue Mint in Beijing. These Hongqian were likely produced by the Aksu Mint and/or the Kucha Mint for circulation in the Ili region. One theory is that this might have been the local idea of what "a regulation cash coin" (制錢) should look like and that this mint mark was used to instill more trust into these Hongqian.

The Kashgar mint closed down in 1908. The Kucha mint introduced new obverse inscriptions for cash coins minted there with the Guang Xu Ding Wei (光緒丁未) in 1907, and Guang Xu Wu Shen (光緒戊申) in 1908. However, production didn't last very long as the Kucha mint finally closed down in 1909.

During the Guangxu period, "red cash coins" also started being produced in the city of Ürümqi.

During the Guangxu period, posthumous Daoguang Tongbao "red cash coins" of 10 wén were produced in Xinjiang.

=== Xuantong era ===
Under the Xuantong Emperor, "Red Cash" with the inscription Xuantong Tongbao (宣統通寶) continued to be produced but at a lower number than before at the Kucha mint. This was because the Kucha mint was the only mint still operating in Xinjiang at the time, but as the Kucha mint closed down in 1911, a year before the fall of the Qing dynasty, the production of "Red Cash" officially ended.

It is notable that some of the "red cash coins" produced at the Kucha mint contain the Uši mint mark (ᠪᠣᠣ
ᡠᠰᡥᡳ) in Manchu and the Kucha mint mark (庫) in Chinese. While it's unorthodox for cash coins produced at one mint to contain the mint marks of another mint, this would have likely occurred because the city of Uši had outsourced the production of its cash coinage to the Kucha Mint, meaning that these cash coins were likely meant for the city of Uši.

== List of Hongqian variants ==
- Fuchsia date(s) = Qianlong Tongbao (乾隆通寶) "red cash coins" that were posthumously produced during the Jiaqing period.
- Green date(s) = Qianlong Tongbao (乾隆通寶) "red cash coins" that were posthumously produced during the Daoguang period.
- Orange date(s) = Qianlong Tongbao (乾隆通寶), Daoguang Tongbao (道光通寶) and Tongzhi Tongbao (同治通寶) "red cash coins" that were posthumously produced during the Guangxu period.

List of "red cash coins" (紅錢)
Obverse inscription (Latin script)	Reverse inscription (Latin script)	Mint	Years of production	Image
乾隆通寶 (Qianlong Tongbao)	ᠠᡴᠰᡠ ئاقسۇ (Aksu - Ak̡su)	Aksu	1761–1766; 1800–1820; 1821–1828; 1878–1883	
乾隆通寶 (Qianlong Tongbao)	九 ᠠᡴᠰᡠ ئاقسۇ (Jiǔ - Aksu - Ak̡su)	Aksu	1883	
乾隆通寶 (Qianlong Tongbao)	當 十 ᠠᡴᠰᡠ ئاقسۇ (Dāng - Shí - Aksu - Ak̡su)	Aksu	1883–1885	
乾隆通寶 (Qianlong Tongbao)	阿 十 ᠠᡴᠰᡠ ئاقسۇ (Ā - Shí - Aksu - Ak̡su)	Aksu	1885–1892	
乾隆通寶 (Qianlong Tongbao)	喀 十 ᠠᡴᠰᡠ ئاقسۇ (Kā - Shí - Aksu - Ak̡su)	Aksu	1880s?	
乾隆通寶 (Qianlong Tongbao)	庫 局 ᠪᠣᠣ ᡴᡠᠴ‍‍‍‍‍‍‍ᡝ (Kù Jú - Boo Kuche)	Kucha (Note: all Guangxu period issues.)	1878–1883	
乾隆通寶 (Qianlong Tongbao)	庫 局 ᡴᡠᠴ‍‍‍‍‍‍‍ᡝ كوجا (Kù Jú - Kuche - Kucha)	Kucha	1878–1883	
乾隆通寶 (Qianlong Tongbao)	ᡴᡠᠴ‍‍‍‍‍‍‍ᡝ كوجا (Kuche - Kucha)	Kucha	1878–1883	
乾隆通寶 (Qianlong Tongbao)	نۇر تېما (Kan Shuy) (Note: Guangxu written in Arabic script. This should be wrong information because Emperor Guangxu reigned from 1889.)	Kucha	1878–1883	
乾隆通寶 (Qianlong Tongbao)	ᠪᠣᠣ ᠴᡳᠣᠸᠠᠨ (Boo Ciowan)	Kucha	1878–1883	
乾隆通寶 (Qianlong Tongbao)	ᠪᠣᠣ ᠶᡠᠸᠠᠨ (Boo Yuwan)	Kucha	1878–1883	
乾隆通寶 (Qianlong Tongbao)	當 十 ᠪᠣᠣ ᠴᡳᠣᠸᠠᠨ (Dāng - Shí - Boo Ciowan)	Kucha	1883–1885	
乾隆通寶 (Qianlong Tongbao)	庫 十 ᠪᠣᠣ ᠴᡳᠣᠸᠠᠨ (Kù - Shí - Boo Ciowan)	Kucha	1886–1888	
乾隆通寶 (Qianlong Tongbao)	庫 十 ᠪᠣᠣ ᠶᡠᠸᠠᠨ (Kù - Shí - Boo Yuwan)	Kucha	1888–1891	
乾隆通寶 (Qianlong Tongbao)	喀 什 ᠪᠣᠣ ᠴᡳᠣᠸᠠᠨ; Kā - Shí - Boo Ciowan)	Kucha (Note: These cash coins were all minted in Kucha for circulation in Kashgar.)	1890s?	
乾隆通寶 (Qianlong Tongbao)	喀 十 ᠪᠣᠣ ᠶᡠᠸᠠᠨ (Kā - Shí - Boo Yuwan)	Kucha (Note: These cash coins were all minted in Kucha for circulation in Kashgar.)	1890s?	
乾隆通寶 (Qianlong Tongbao)	ᡠᡧᡳ اﺷﻲ (Ushi - Uši)	Uqturpan	1766–1769; 1771–1798	
乾隆通寶 (Qianlong Tongbao)	ᠶᡝᡵᡴᡳᠮ يارﻛﻨﺪ (Yerkim - Yəkən)	Yarkant	1760–1769	
乾隆通寶 (Qianlong Tongbao)	ᠶᡝᡵᡴᡳᠶᠠᠩ يارﻛﻨﺪ (Yerkiyang - Yəkən)	Yarkant	1760–1769	
嘉慶通寶 (Jiaqing Tongbao)	ᠠᡴᠰᡠ ئاقسۇ (Aksu - Ak̡su)	Aksu	1798–1820	
道光通寶 (Daoguang Tongbao)	ᠠᡴᠰᡠ ئاقسۇ (Aksu - Ak̡su)	Aksu	1821–1828	
道光通寶 (Daoguang Tongbao)	八年 五 ᠠᡴᠰᡠ ئاقسۇ (Bā nián - Wǔ - Aksu - Ak̡su)	Aksu	1829–1850	
道光通寶 (Daoguang Tongbao)	八年 十 ᠠᡴᠰᡠ ئاقسۇ (Bā nián - Shí - Aksu - Ak̡su)	Aksu	1828–1850	
道光通寶 (Daoguang Tongbao)	阿 十 ᠠᡴᠰᡠ ئاقسۇ (Ā - Shí - Aksu - Ak̡su)	Aksu	1885–1892	
道光通寶 (Daoguang Tongbao)	庫 十 ᡴᡠᠴ‍‍‍‍‍‍‍ᡝ كوجا (Kù - Shí - Kuche - Kucha)	Kucha	1883–1885	
道光通寶 (Daoguang Tongbao)	新 十 ᠪᠣᠣ ᠴᡳᠣᠸᠠᠨ (Xīn - Shí - Boo Ciowan)	Kucha Bao Xin	1885–1886	
道光通寶 (Daoguang Tongbao)	新 十 ᠪᠣᠣ ᠴᡳᠣᠸᠠᠨ (Xīn - Shí - Boo Ciowan) (Note: Same text as above, but upside down.)	Kucha Bao Xin	1885–1886	
道光通寶 (Daoguang Tongbao)	庫 十 ᠪᠣᠣ ᠴᡳᠣᠸᠠᠨ (Kù - Shí - Boo Ciowan)	Kucha	1886–1888	
咸豐通寶 (Xianfeng Tongbao)	當 五 ᠠᡴᠰᡠ ئاقسۇ (Dāng Wǔ - Aksu - Ak̡su)	Aksu	1851–1861	
咸豐通寶 (Xianfeng Tongbao)	當 十 ᠠᡴᠰᡠ ئاقسۇ (Dāng Shí - Aksu - Ak̡su)	Aksu	1851–1861	
咸豐重寶 (Xianfeng Zhongbao)	當 五十 ᠠᡴᠰᡠ ئاقسۇ (Dāng Wǔ Shí - Aksu - Ak̡su)	Aksu	1853–1859	
咸豐元寶 (Xianfeng Yuanbao)	當 百 ᠠᡴᠰᡠ ئاقسۇ (Dāng Bǎi - Aksu - Ak̡su)	Aksu	1854–1859	
咸豐通寶 (Xianfeng Tongbao)	當 十 ᡴᠠᡧᡳᡤᠠᡵ قەشقەر (Dāng Shí - Kashigar - Ⱪǝxⱪǝr)	Kashgar	1855–1859	
咸豐重寶 (Xianfeng Zhongbao)	當 五十 ᡴᠠᡧᡳᡤᠠᡵ قەشقەر (Dāng Wǔ Shí - Kashigar - Ⱪǝxⱪǝr)	Kashgar	1855–1859	
咸豐元寶 (Xianfeng Yuanbao)	當 百 ᡴᠠᡧᡳᡤᠠᡵ قەشقەر (Dāng Bǎi - Kashigar - Ⱪǝxⱪǝr)	Kashgar	1855–1859	
咸豐通寶 (Xianfeng Tongbao)	當 五 ᡴᡠᠴ‍‍‍‍‍‍‍ᡝ كوجا (Dāng Wǔ - Kuche - Kucha)	Kucha	1853–1861	
咸豐通寶 (Xianfeng Tongbao)	當 十 ᡴᡠᠴ‍‍‍‍‍‍‍ᡝ كوجا (Dāng Shí - Kuche - Kucha)	Kucha	1853–1861	
咸豐重寶 (Xianfeng Zhongbao)	當 五十 ᠠᡴᠰᡠ (Dāng Wǔ Shí - Kuche - Kucha)	Kucha	1853–1856	
咸豐元寶 (Xianfeng Yuanbao)	當 百 ᡴᡠᠴ‍‍‍‍‍‍‍ᡝ كوجا (Dāng Bǎi - Kuche - Kucha)	Kucha	1853–1856	
咸豐通寶 (Xianfeng Tongbao)	當 十 ᠶᡝᡵᡴᡳᠶᠠᠩ يارﻛﻨﺪ (Dāng Shí - Yerkiyang - Yəkən)	Yarkant	1853–1861	
咸豐重寶 (Xianfeng Zhongbao)	當 五十 ᠶᡝᡵᡴᡳᠶᠠᠩ يارﻛﻨﺪ (Dāng Wǔ Shí - Yerkiyang - Yəkən)	Yarkant	1853–1859	
咸豐元寶 (Xianfeng Yuanbao)	當 百 ᠶᡝᡵᡴᡳᠶᠠᠩ يارﻛﻨﺪ (Dāng Bǎi - Yerkiyang - Yəkən)	Yarkant	1854–1859	
同治通寶 (Tongzhi Tongbao)	當 五 ᠠᡴᠰᡠ ئاقسۇ (Dāng Wǔ - Aksu - Ak̡su)	Aksu	1862–1863	
同治通寶 (Tongzhi Tongbao)	當 十 ᠠᡴᠰᡠ ئاقسۇ (Dāng Shí - Aksu - Ak̡su)	Aksu	1862–1863	
同治通寶 (Tongzhi Tongbao)	當 五 ᡴᡠᠴ‍‍‍‍‍‍‍ᡝ كوجا (Dāng Wǔ - Kuche - Kucha)	Kucha	1862–1863	
同治通寶 (Tongzhi Tongbao)	當 十 ᡴᡠᠴ‍‍‍‍‍‍‍ᡝ كوجا (Dāng Shí - Kuche - Kucha)	Kucha	1862–1863	
同治通寶 (Tongzhi Tongbao)	庫 十 ᡴᡠᠴ‍‍‍‍‍‍‍ᡝ كوجا (Kù - Shí - Kuche - Kucha)	Kucha	1883–1885	
同治通寶 (Tongzhi Tongbao)	新 十 ᠪᠣᠣ ᠴᡳᠣᠸᠠᠨ (Xīn - Shí - Boo Chuan)	Kucha Bao Xin	1885–1886	
同治通寶 (Tongzhi Tongbao)	庫 十 ᠪᠣᠣ ᠴᡳᠣᠸᠠᠨ (Kù - Shí - Boo Chuan)	Kucha	1886–1888	
同治通寶 (Tongzhi Tongbao)	當 十 ᠶᡝᡵᡴᡳᠶᠠᠩ يەكەن (Dāng Shí - Yerkiyang - Yəkən)	Yarkant	1862–1863	
سيد غازي راشدين خان (Sayyid Ghazi Rashidin Khan)	زرب دار السلطانات كوجا (Zarb dar al-Sultanat Kuqa)	Kucha	1864–1865	
سيد غازي راشدين خان (Sayyid Ghazi Rashidin Khan) (Note: The characters on this series are larger than the previous one which featured rather small Arabic writing.)	زرب دار السلطانات كوجا (Zarb dar al-Sultanat Kuqa)	Kucha	1865–1867	
سيد غازي راشدين خان (Sayyid Ghazi Rashidin Khan)	زرب دار السلطانات أقسو (Zarb dar al-Sultanat Aqsu)	Aksu	1864–1867	
光緒通寶 (Guangxu Tongbao)	阿 十 ᠠᡴᠰᡠ ئاقسۇ (Ā - Shí - Aksu - Ak̡su)	Aksu	1885–1892	
光緒通寶 (Guangxu Tongbao)	喀 十 ᠠᡴᠰᡠ ئاقسۇ (Kā - Shí - Aksu - Ak̡su)	Aksu	1880s?	
光緒通寶 (Guangxu Tongbao)	喀 十 ᠪᠣᠣ قەشقەر (Kā - Shí - Boo - Ⱪǝxⱪǝr)	Kashgar	1882–1907	
光緒通寶 (Guangxu Tongbao)	ᡴᡠᠴ‍‍‍‍‍‍‍ᡝ كوجا; Kuche - Kucha)	Kucha	1878–1883	
光緒通寶 (Guangxu Tongbao)	九年 十 ᡴᡠᠴ‍‍‍‍‍‍‍ᡝ كوجا (Jiǔ nián - Shí - Kuche - Kucha)	Kucha	1883	
光緒通寶 (Guangxu Tongbao)	庫 十 ᡴᡠᠴ‍‍‍‍‍‍‍ᡝ كوجا (Kù - Shí - Kuche - Kucha)	Kucha	1883–1885	
光緒通寶 (Guangxu Tongbao)	庫 十 ᠪᠣᠣ ᠶᡠᠸᠠᠨ (Kù - Shí - Boo Yuwan)	Kucha	1886–1888	
光緒通寶 (Guangxu Tongbao)	庫 十 ᠪᠣᠣ ᠶᡠᠸᠠᠨ (Kù - Shí - Boo Yuwan)	Kucha	1888–1891	
光緒通寶 (Guangxu Tongbao)	喀 十 ᠪᠣᠣ ᠶᡠᠸᠠᠨ (Kā - Shí - Boo Yuwan)	Kucha	1890s?	
光緒丁未 (Guangxu Dingwei)	新 十 ᠪᠣᠣ ᠴᡳᠣᠸᠠᠨ (Xīn - Shí - Boo Ciowan)	Kucha	1907	
光緒戊申 (Guangxu Wushen)	新 十 ᠪᠣᠣ ᠴᡳᠣᠸᠠᠨ (Xīn - Shí - Boo Ciowan)	Kucha	1908	
宣統通寶 (Xuantong Tongbao)	庫 十 ᠪᠣᠣ ᡠᡧᡳ (Kù - Shí - Boo Ushi)	Kucha	1909	

== Banknotes denominated in "red cash coins" ==
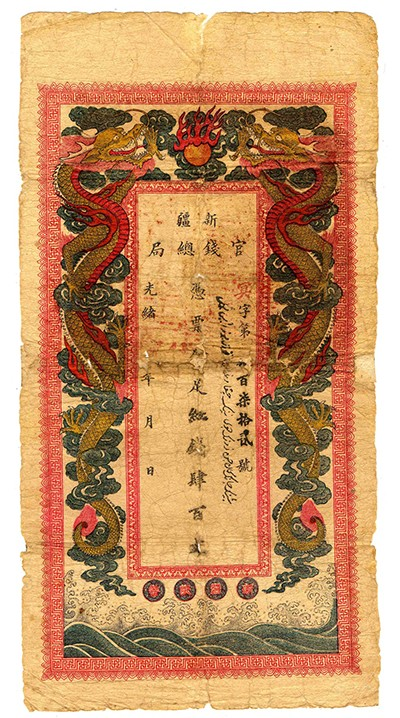
A 1908 (光緒戊申年) banknote nicknamed "the old dragon note" (老龍票) issued by the Official Central Mint of Xinjiang denominated in 400 "red cash coins".

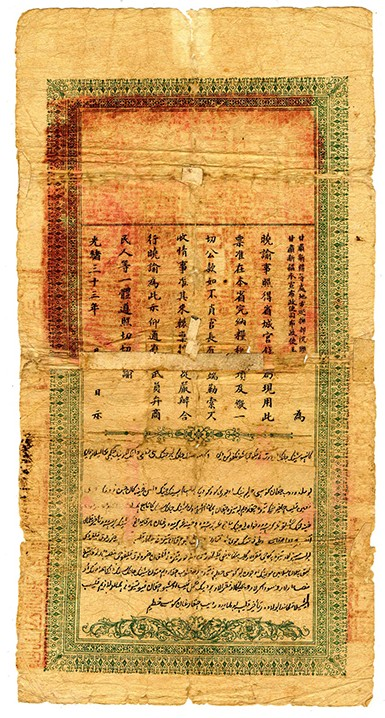
A 1908 (光緒戊申年) banknote nicknamed "the old dragon note" (老龍票) issued by the Official Central Mint of Xinjiang denominated in 400 "red cash coins".

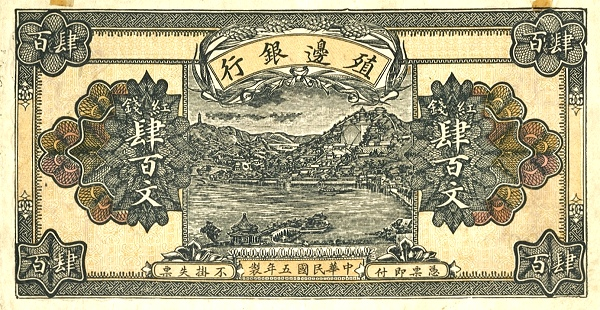
A 1916 banknote issued by the Bank of Territorial Development during the Republic of China denominated in 400 "red cash coins". This side of the banknote is written in Traditional Chinese characters.

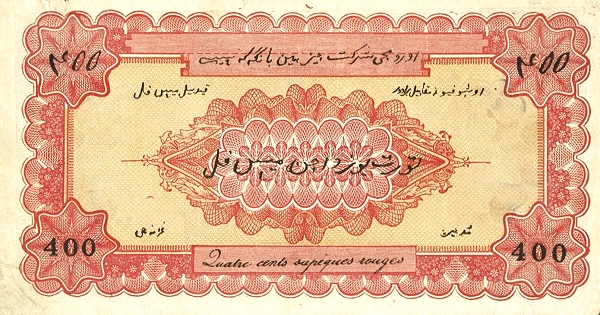
A 1916 banknote issued by the Bank of Territorial Development during the Republic of China denominated in 400 "red cash coins". The text of this side in Uyghur (in Arabic script) with the French text "Quatre cents sapèques rouges" (four hundred red cash coins) at the bottom.

== Sources ==
- Hartill, David (2005). Cast Chinese Coins: A Historical Catalogue. Trafford. ISBN 978-1-4120-5466-9.
- Hartill, David, Qing cash, Royal Numismatic Society Special Publication 37, London, 2003.
- Lin Guoming and Ma Dehe, Xinjiang jin yinbi tushuo (新疆金銀圖説), Taipei, 1990. (in Mandarin Chinese).
- Peng Xinwei (彭信威) (1954 [2007]). Zhongguo huobi shi (中國貨幣史) (Shanghai: Qunlian chubanshe), 580–581, 597–605. (in Mandarin Chinese).
- Peng Xinwei (彭信威) (1994) A monetary history of China (translated by Edward H. Kaplan). Western Washington University (Bellingham, Washington).
- Woodward Tracey, The minted Ten Cash coins of China, Oakland, 1971.
- Zhu Zhuopeng and Zhu Shengtao, Xinjiang hongqian (新疆紅錢), Shanghai, 1991. (in Mandarin Chinese).
