= Zhiqian =

Chinese coin

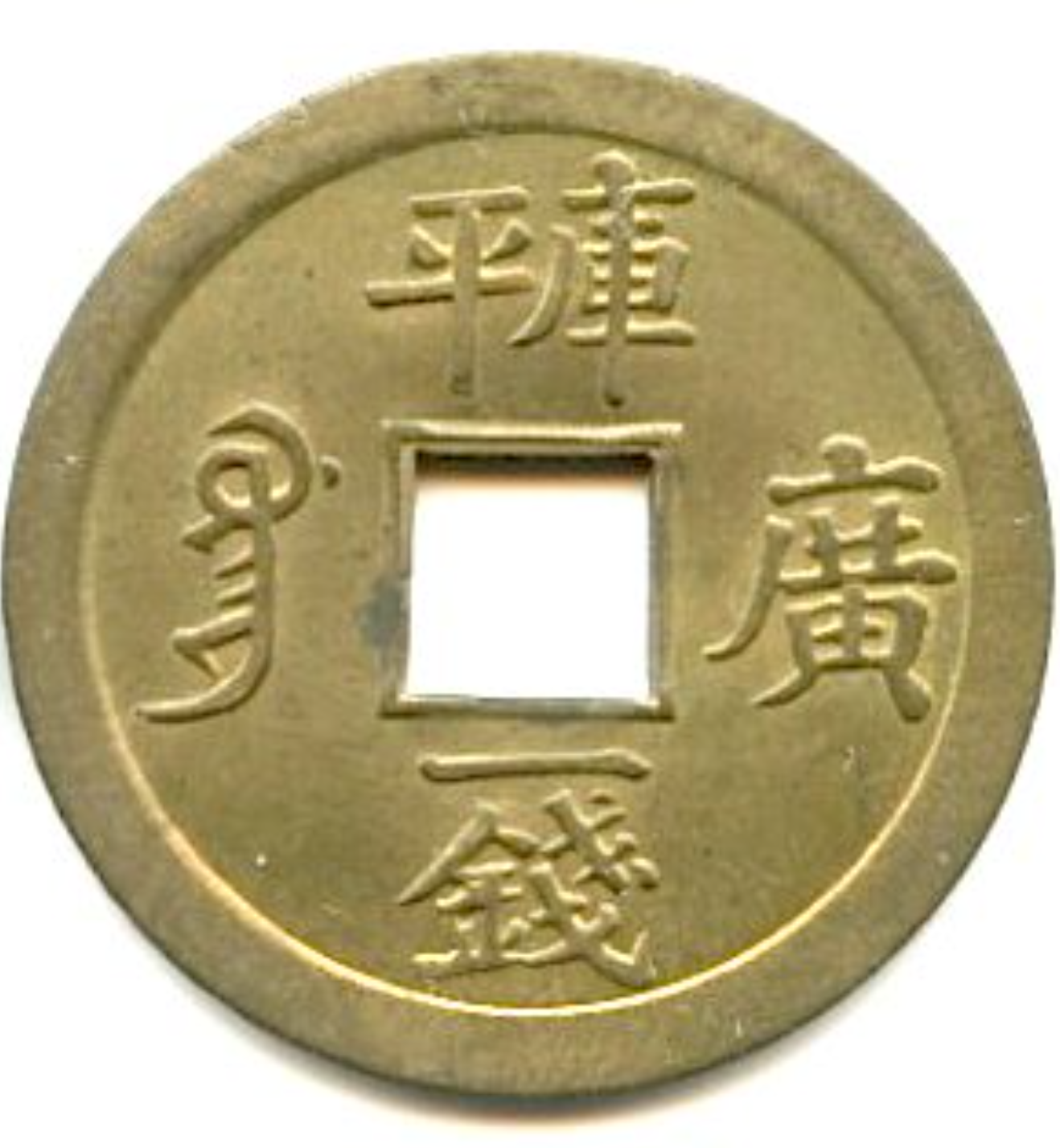
A late-19th-century machine-struck Guangxu Tongbao (光緒通寶) cash coin of 1 wén with a standard weight of 1 Kuping Qian (庫平錢), which was the nationally set standard weight for cash coins during the Guangxu era.

Standard cash (traditional Chinese: 制錢; simplified Chinese: 制钱; pinyin: zhì qián; Manchu: ᡳ
ᠵᡳᡴᠠ; Möllendorff: Durun i jiha), or regulation cash coins, is a term used during the Ming and Qing dynasties of China to refer to standard issue copper-alloy cash coins produced in imperial Chinese mints according to weight and composition standards that were fixed by the imperial government. The term was first used for Hongwu Tongbao cash coins following the abolition of large denomination versions of this cash coin series.

== Terminology ==
The term "Zhiqian" was used to discern full-valued cash coins produced by the imperial government from older ones from the Song dynasty period, which were known as jiuqian (舊錢), and privately produced forgeries of non-standard weights and alloys that were referred to as siqian (私錢) or sizhuqian (私鑄錢).

Other terms used during the Ming dynasty for various types of cash coins include yangqian (样錢, "Model coin"), also known as Beiqian (北錢, "Northern coin"), which referred to full weight (1 qián) and fine quality cash coins had were delivered to Beijing as seigniorage revenue. Fengqian (俸錢, "Stipend coin") which referred to second rate cash coins that had a weight of 0.9 qián and were distributed through the salaries of government officials and emoluments. and Shangqian (賞錢, "Tip money") which is a term used to refer to cash coins that were small, thin, and very fragile (comparable to Sizhuqian) that were used to pay the wages of employees of the imperial government (including the mint workers themselves) and was one of the most commonly circulating types of cash coins during the Ming dynasty among the general population.

== Design ==
The design of the standard Chinese cash coin was round, while it had a square centre hole that allowed them to be strung together. The inner rim as well as the outer rim of the cash coin was slightly elevated, and on the obverse side of the coin was the era name (or reign motto) of the reigning emperor, during the Ming dynasty the reverse side of their cash coins tended to be blank, while Qing dynasty period cash coins often contained mint marks.

== Ming dynasty ==
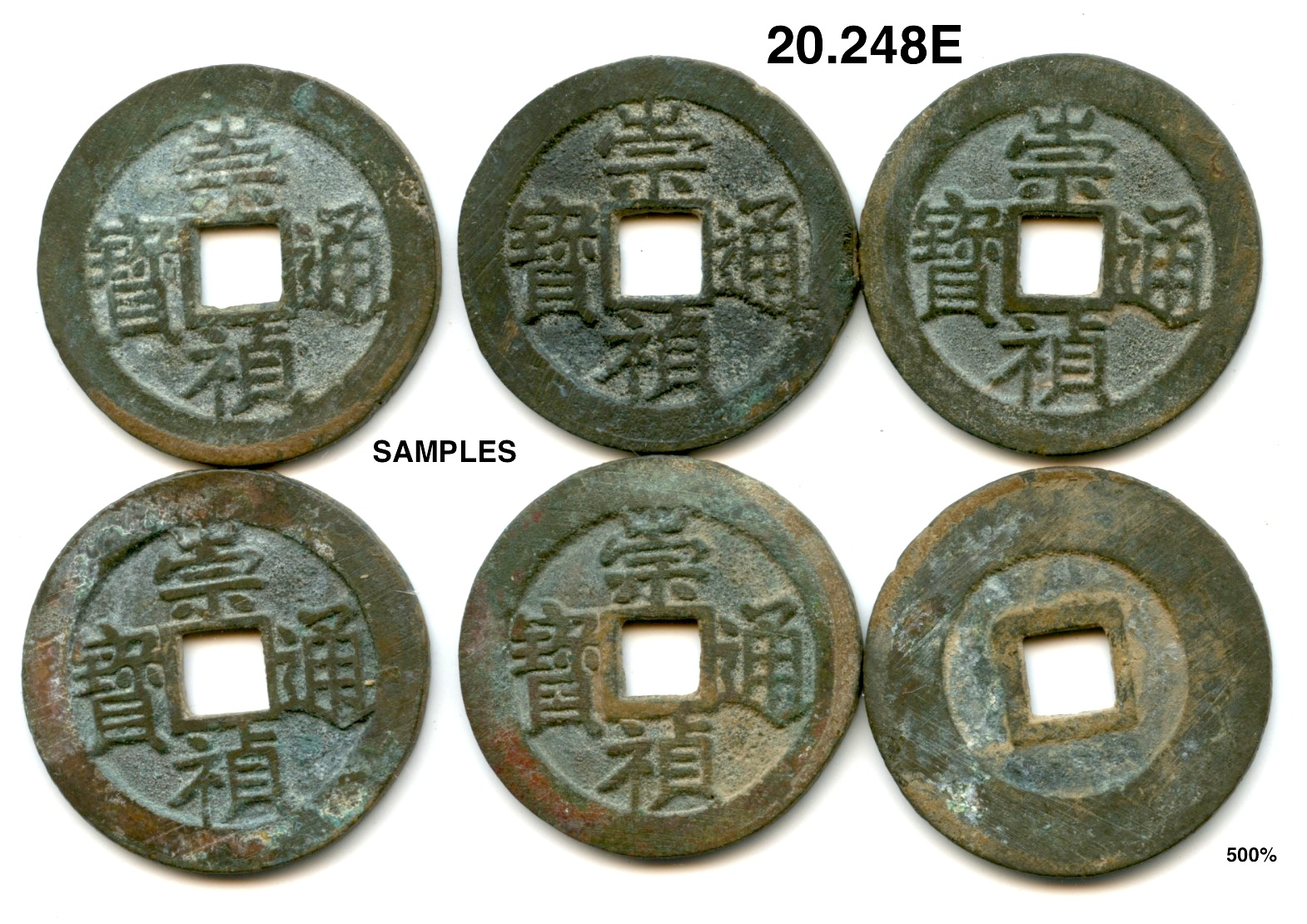
Various Chongzhen Tongbao (崇禎通寶) Zhiqian.

In the year 1361 the Ming dynasty established its first imperial mint Baoyuanju (寶源局) in the capital city of Yingtian, by Zhu Yuanzhang who at the time ruled under the title of "Prince of Wu" and created the mint before the Mongol Yuan dynasty was driven out of China. The first cash coins produced by the Baoyuanju had the inscription Dazhong Tongbao (大中通寶), these new cash coins continued circulating and co-existing next to older cash coins. Following the Ming conquest of all of China the Ming government started establishing provincial mints, known as Baoquanju (寶泉局). These new cash coins had the inscription Hongwu Tongbao (洪武通寶). The government of the Ming dynasty then made the private production of cash coins illegal. These early Hongwu Tongbao cash coins were issued in multiple denominations. However, after only four years, the denominations larger than 1 wén and the Dazhong Tongbao were abolished.

The government of the Ming dynasty attempted to collect all older cash coins and to recast them into 1 wén coins with a weight of 1 qián (which is about 3.7 grams in the metric system).

While standard 1 wén cash coins with the inscriptions Yongle Tongbao (永樂通寶), Xuande Tongbao (宣德通寶), and Hongzhi Tongbao (弘治通寶) were produced, the government of the Ming dynasty had a preference for making and receiving payments in Great Ming Treasure Note paper notes and privately issued banknotes.

The composition of the Yongle Tongbao was generally 63–90% copper (Cu), 10–25% lead (Pb), 6–9% tin (Sn), and 0.04–0.18% zinc (Zn). The Yongle Tongbao cash coins were notably not manufactured for the internal Chinese market where silver coinage and paper money would continue to dominate, but were in fact produced to help stimulate international trade as Chinese cash coins were used as a common form of currency throughout South, Southeast, and East Asia.

In the year 1433, due to the devaluation of the Great Ming Treasure Note banknotes, the government of the Ming dynasty resumed the casting of cash coins again. The casting of these new Xuande Tongbao cash coins was divided between the two Ministry of Public Works mints in both capital cities. Furthermore, Xuande Tongbao cash coins were also produced at the branch mints in Zhejiang, Jiangxi, Fujian, and Guangdong. The official production of cash coins ceased once again for seven decades in 1435 and the private production of copper-alloy cash coins would once again become commonplace.

Despite the government preferring paper money over copper-alloy cash coins, the Chinese market had a high demand for them. This demand would stimulate an overproduction of forgeries that inundated the markets of Ming China. Often these forged cash coins were cast in such miserable quality that a single real Zhiqian could buy 300 fake ones. Consequently, this caused inflation in many different places.

In the year 1503 under the Hongzhi Emperor the production of cash coins was resumed and the Zhiqian were given a standard weight of 1.2 qián, the government stipulated that for each catty of pure copper two taels of haoyin (好鍚, "superior tin") was to be added to the alloy of these coins. As the government of the Ming dynasty had closed its coin mints for such a long period of time, the government was forced to pardon illegal producers and hire them as mint workers.

Under the reign of the Jiajing Emperor the government of the Ming dynasty would alleviate the situation by producing a large amount of Zhiqian with the inscription Jiajing Tongbao (嘉靖通寶) in the year Jiajing 5 (1527). In the year Jiajing 11 (1553) the government of the Ming dynasty cast 10,000,000 additional Jiajing Tongbao cash coins and allegedly as well as Zhiqian with 9 earlier reign era names, a total amount of 1,000,000 dìng (錠). (Note: 1 dìng (錠) is equal to 5,000 cash coins (文).) Because of the possibility that under the Jiajing Emperor cash coins were produced with earlier reign titles the attribution of some earlier cash coins is still disputed among modern scholars. However, Schjöth noted that the proposal to also cast 95,000,000 strings of these 9 earlier reign titles might not have actually been adopted and that these cash coins were local and Japanese forgeries. The standard weight of Jiajing Tongbao was 1.2 qián.

In the year 1570 during the reign of the Longqing Emperor cash coins with a weight of 1.3 qián were once again cast until the death of the emperor in 1572.

In the spring of 1572, the Ming dynasty government once again resumed the production of standard cash coins at the Beijing and Nanjing mints. It did not take long for the mints to be opened in Yunnan, Shanxi, Shandong, Henan, Shaanxi, Jiangxi, Fujian, and Huguang, these Zhiqian all weighed 1.3 qián. The alloy of the Wanli Tongbao (萬曆通寶) cash coins was set at 93.8% brass and 6.2% tin. The rising price of copper, lack of skilled mint workers, and poor distribution from the government mints all contributed to the failure of the Wanli Tongbao cash coins by the year 1579. The first provincial mint to close was that of Yunnan in the year 1580 which was quickly followed by most provincial mints in 1582. The only successful provincial mints were of Huguang, where three different local mints cast their own cash coins that did not conform to the Zhiqian standards.

In the year 1599 the Wanli administration made another attempt at the restoration of cash coinage, during this attempt the Ministry of Public Works opened up a second mint in the city of Nanjing, this increased the number of furnaces from 60 to 250. Proposals for the Nanjing Ministry of Revenue and River Transport Intendancy to establish new mints in the city were also accepted. The Ever Normal Granary mint was established during this period with 250 furnaces. The city of Nanjing was quickly awash with a glut of coinage, which caused the production of cash coins in the year 1606 to be scaled back to an annual production of 15,000 strings with some government mints being closed.

In the early 17th century, an increase in the price of copper caused the government to reduce the amount of copper in the composition of the Zhiqian in favour of lead. Cash coins with the inscriptions Tianqi Tongbao (天啟通寶) and Chongzhen Tongbao (崇禎通寶) were of poorer quality than those producing during preceding periods, these cash coins tended to be both thin and bristle, due to the reduced amount of copper in their composition. Chinese people at this point started to refrain from using copper-alloy cash coins and the markets preferred the usage of silver ingots instead.

In the year 1622 the Ministry of Revenue established its own mint in Beijing. This was done to help finance the continued rising cost of fighting the Manchu invasions. The Ministry of Revenue also established a number of branch mints in Nanjing, but the rivalry between the Ministry of Revenue and the Ministry of Public Works prevented the Ming dynasty from adopting an effective monetary policy. By the year 1623 there were five different concurrent government mints operating in the city of Nanjing, two of which were run by the Ministry of Public Works, two by the Ministry of Revenue, and one by the Nanjing municipal government.

The melting down of copper artifacts which were of great historical and religious significance upset a number Conservative government officials, which further added to the already poor reputation of the Tianqi Tongbao cash coins.

Some Chongzhen Tongbao cash coins were produced with the denomination 2 wén and Chongzhen Tongbao cash coins produced by the Ministry of Public Work mint had the mint mark "工" (Gong) inscribed to its reverse.

The standard Chongzhen Tongbao cash coins initially weighed 1.3 qián, but by 1630 cash coins produced in the north had a weight of 1 qián and those in the south at most 8 fēn.

== Qing dynasty ==
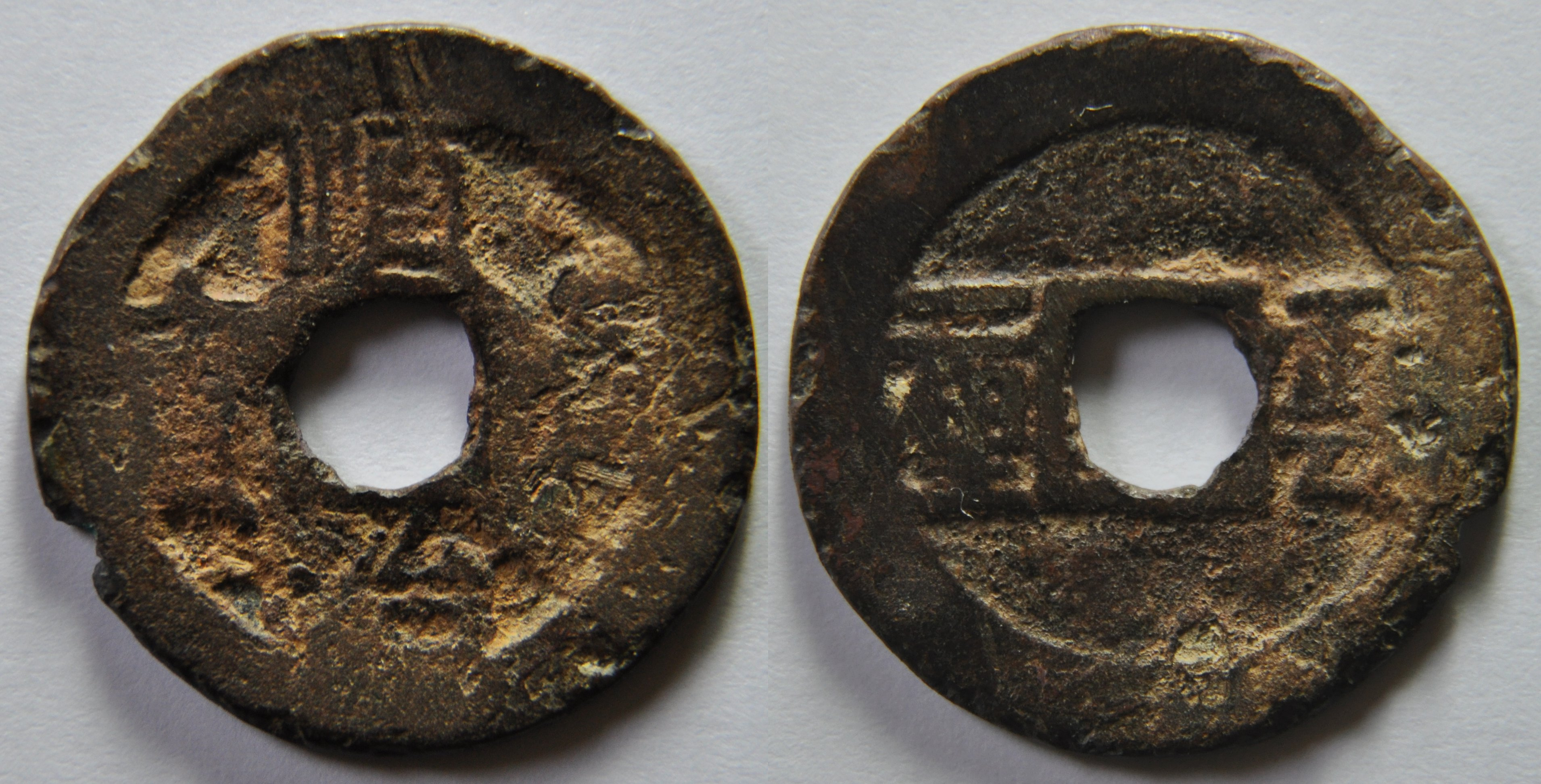
A Shunzhi Tongbao (順治通寶) standard cash coin with an official silver exchange rate set at the value of 1 cash (weight) in silver.

Prior to the Manchu conquest of China, the Later Jin dynasty already produced its own cash coins with the inscriptions Abkai fulingga han jiha (ᠠᠪᡴᠠᡳ
ᡶᡠᠯᡳᠩᡤᠠ
ᡥᠠᠨ
ᠵᡳᡴᠠ), Tianming Tongbao (天命通寶), and Sure han ni jiha (ᠰᡠᡵᡝ
ᡥᠠᠨ
ᠨᡳ
ᠵᡳᡴᠠ).

During the Qing dynasty period, the Chinese monetary system was a bimetallic system where both copper-alloy cash coins and silver circulated simultaneously. The copper-alloy currency during most of the Qing dynasty period consisted solely of cash coins with a denomination of 1 wén, which could be strung together into strings of 1,000 cash coins for larger payments. While strings officially consisted of 1,000 cash coins, normally it would contain only around 980 copper-alloy cash coins. Because all copper-alloy cash coins of the Qing dynasty had both uniform shapes and weights, the denomination of the cash coins were not written down anywhere on the coins themselves. This was because for most of their history, a cash coin was always valued at 1 wén and payments were processed by counting the number of cash coins. The government of the Qing dynasty monopolised the production of copper-alloy cash coins, which constituted less than 20% of the total money circulating in China at the time, as well as the mining of copper, while the government allowed for the market to determine the price of silver.

Following capture of Beijing by the Manchus from the Shun dynasty in the year 1644, the government of the Qing dynasty established two imperial mints, one under the jurisdiction of the Ministry of Revenue and one under the jurisdiction of the Ministry of Public Works. The standard cash coins produced at the Ministry of Revenue mint would later bear the Manchu mint mark "ᠪᠣᠣ
ᠴᡳᠣᠸᠠᠨ" (Boo Ciowan) and those cast at the Ministry of Public Works mint would have the Manchu mint mark "ᠪᠣᠣ
ᠶᡠᠸᠠᠨ" (Boo Yuwan). The Qing government then further stipulated that every province should establish their own provincial mint for the production of copper-alloy cash coins.

Standard copper-alloy cash coins were cast by using models, known as fanzhu (笵鑄), in these state-operated mints, of which there were two in the city of Beijing, and one in almost each provincial capital city. Zhiqian were to be produced in casting rounds, known as mǎo (卯). These casting rounds had a predefined number of cash coins to be produced, copying the imperial standard with their exact standardised dimensions and metallic compositions. The obverse side of the standard cash coin would always contain the current reign era name with "Tongbao" (通寶) inscribed on it.

The initial alloy was fixed at 70% copper, known as hongtong (紅銅) and 30% of zinc, known as baiqian (白鉛). The two imperial mints in Beijing were the only places where official standard cash coins were manufactured during the early years of the Qing dynasty period. The later official alloy was altered to 60% copper and 40% zinc and/or lead, but the actual compositions would de facto be determined by the private market, causing the government of the Qing dynasty to alter the official copper-alloy of the Zhiqian over time.

During the Shunzhi period another type of Zhiqian known as the Yiliqian (一厘錢, "one-cash coin"), referred to as Zheyinqian (折銀錢, "conversion coins") by Chinese numismatists, (Note: Chinese numismatists use the term "conversion coins" because of their official fixed value compared with silver.) was cast. This term was used to designate Shunzhi Tongbao cash coins produced from the year 1653 that had the inscription "一厘" on the left to the square centre hole on their reverse sides. This inscription indicates that the nominal value of the cash coin corresponded to 0.001 tael of silver (1 li (釐 or 厘, "cash"), as a weight). This would mean that the official government conversation rate was set as zhé yín yì lí qián (折銀一厘錢), which was proof that silver was of continuing importance as a currency of account. Similar cash coins with this reverse inscription were also being produced by some rulers of the Southern Ming dynasty.

Until the Kangxi Tongbao (康熙通寶) the official composition of the Zhiqian remained at 60% copper and 40% zinc and/or lead, the Yongzheng Tongbao (雍正通寶) cash coins had a composition of 50% copper and 50% zinc and/or lead, and the Qianlong Tongbao (乾隆通寶) had an additional 2% tin added to their official alloy. The Zhiqian that contained tin were referred to as Qingqian (青錢, "green cash").

The actual weight of the standard cash coin would also vary over time. This official weight was usually between 1 qián (c. 3.7g) and 1.4 qián. In the year 1645 the standard weight was altered to 1.2 qián, in 1651 this was further changed to 1.25 qián, and in the year 1657 to 1.4 qián. After the year 1733 it was officially fixed to be at 1.2 qián.

The official exchange rate between Zhiqian and silver in the year 1644 was inherited from the mid-Ming period and stood at 7 standard cash coins per 0.01 tael, or 1 fēn (分), of silver, while old Ming dynasty period cash coins were traded at a rate of 14 cash coins per 1 fēn of silver. In the year 1645 the official exchange rate was fixed at 10 standard cash coins per fēn of silver.

During the reign of the Xianfeng Emperor the government of the Qing dynasty introduced a number of currency reforms that re-introduced multiple denominations. These large denomination cash coins were referred to as Daqian ("big cash"). These cash coins were produced until the year 1890 and the standard 1 wén cash coin would become the norm again until the fall of the Qing dynasty in 1911. Xianfeng era Zhiqian (or 1 wén cash coins) were cast of copper, iron, and zinc. All Xianfeng era Zhiqian had the obverse inscription Xianfeng Tongbao (咸豐通寶).

During the Tongzhi era the weight of the Zhiqian remained at 1.2 qián, but due to the depletion of copper in Yunnan and the high import costs of Japanese copper, provincial mints would often reduce the weights. In the year 1867 the imperial government issued an unsuccessful edit for all central and eastern provincial mints to cast Zhiqian with a weight of 1 qián to be transported to Tianjin to help alleviate copper shortages in Beijing.

The Zhiqian of 1890 was officially given a weight of 1 qián to be cast by both the imperial mints in Beijing and provincial mints. In the year 1899 the weight of the Zhiqian was reduced to only 8 fēn.

Peng Xinwei estimated that during the late Qing dynasty period, the total copper sector (copper coins including standard cash and the new Great Qing Copper Coin minted after the year 1900) constituted only 17% of the total money in circulation in China.

The standard Xuantong Tongbao (宣統通寶) cash coins produced at the Ministry of Revenue mint between the years 1909 and 1910 had a weight of 6 fēn and were both cast and machine-struck.

== Banknotes denominated in Zhiqian ==
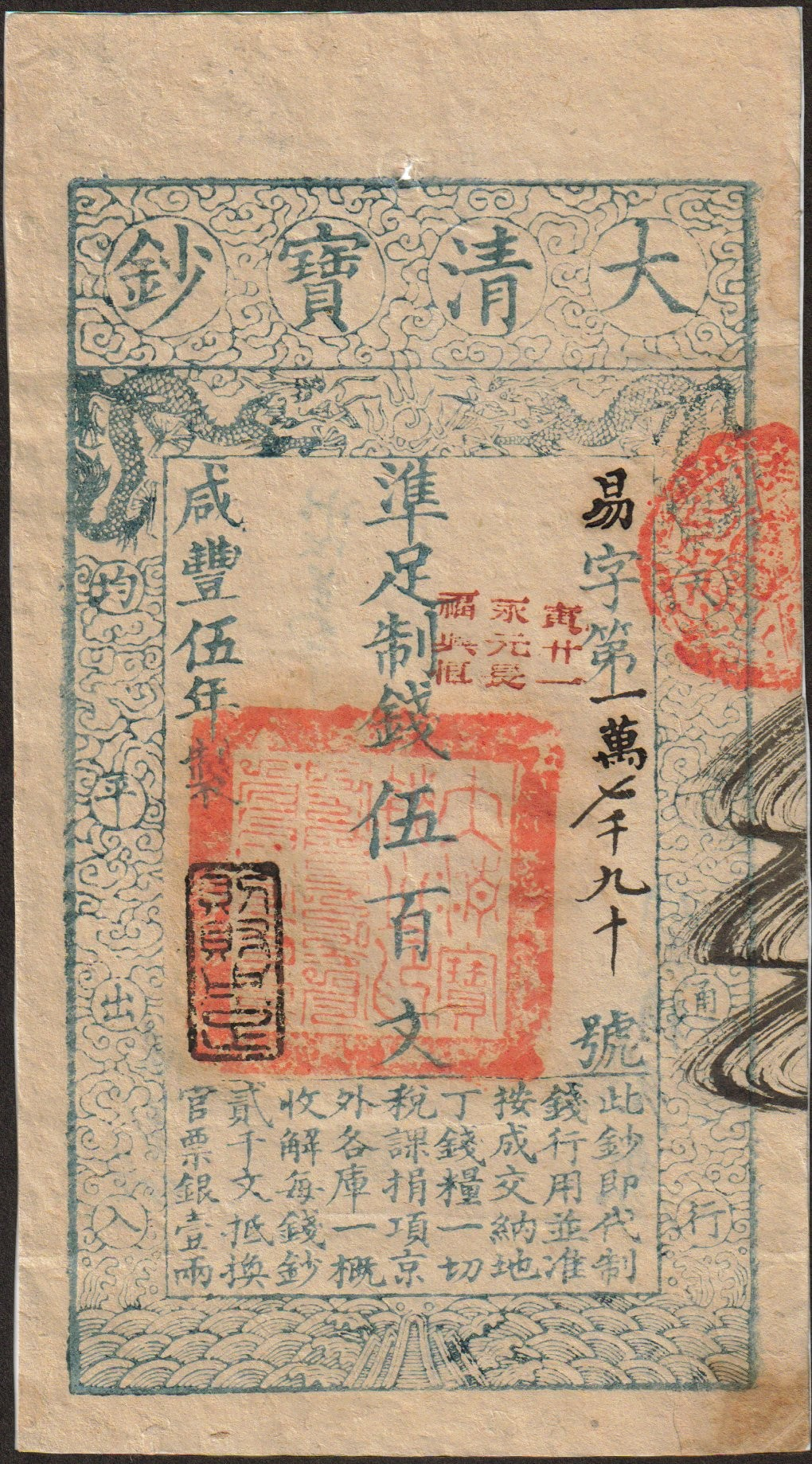
A Great Qing Treasure Note (大清寶鈔) banknote of 500 wén denominated in Zhiqian.

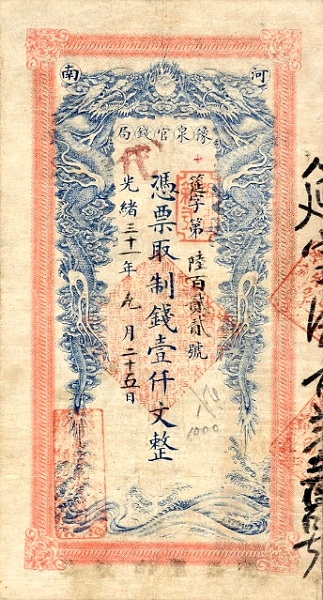
A 1904 banknote of 1000 wén issued by the Provincial Bank of Honan.

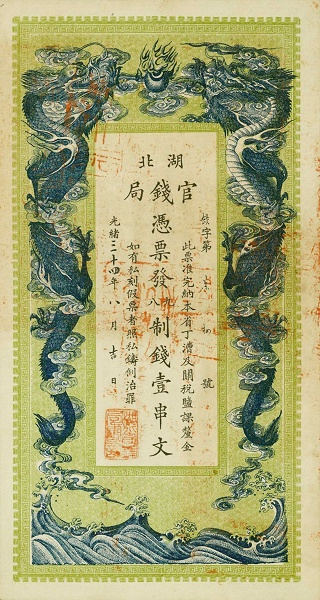
A 1908 banknote of 1 chuàn of Zhiqian issued by the Hupeh Government Cash Bank.

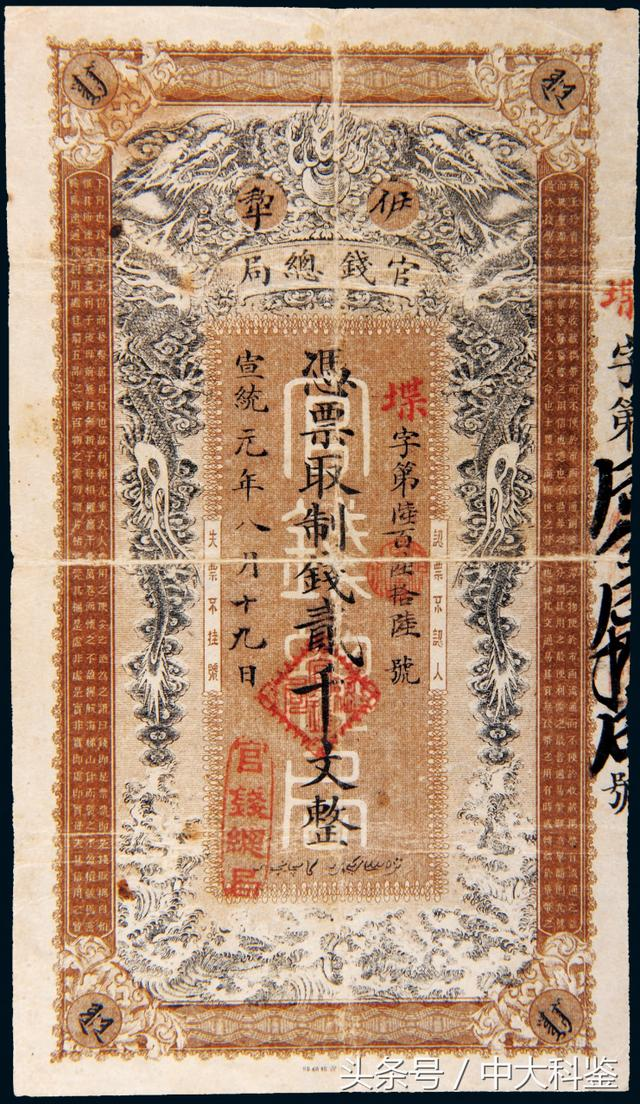
A 1909 (宣統元年) banknote of 2000 wén in Zhiqian issued by the Ili Official Currency Bureau for circulation in Yining, Xinjiang.

== Sources ==
- Cong Hanxiang (從翰香) and Xie Hangsheng (謝杭生) (1992). "Zhiqian (制錢)", in Zhongguo da baike quanshu (中國大百科全書), Zhongguo lishi (中國歷史) (Beijing/Shanghai: Zhongguo da baike quanshu chubanshe), Vol. 3, 1535. (in Mandarin Chinese).
- Hartill, David (2005). Cast Chinese Coins. Trafford, United Kingdom: Trafford Publishing. ISBN 978-1412054669..
- Hartill, David, Qing cash, Royal Numismatic Society Special Publication 37, London, 2003.
- Peng Xinwei (彭信威) (1954 [2007]). Zhongguo huobi shi (中國貨幣史) (Shanghai: Qunlian chubanshe), 580–581, 597–605. (in Mandarin Chinese).
- Peng Xinwei (彭信威) (1994) A monetary history of China (translated by Edward H. Kaplan). Western Washington University (Bellingham, Washington).
- T'ang Yu K'un : 制錢通考 (A comprehensive study of Chinese coins.) (in Mandarin Chinese).
