= Daqian =

19th-century Chinese cash coins

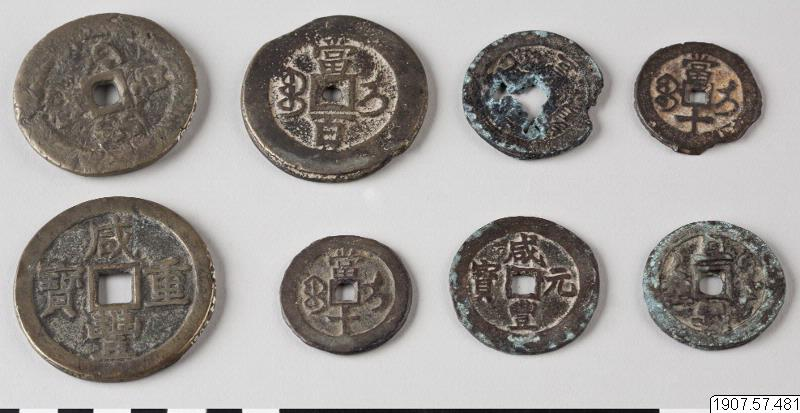
Various denominations of large value Xianfeng era cash coins produced by the Ili Mint, Xinjiang.

Daqian (Traditional Chinese: 大錢, "big cash") are large-denomination cash coins produced in the Qing dynasty starting from 1853 until 1890. Large denomination cash coins were previously used in earlier Chinese dynasties and had faced similar issues as 19th-century Daqian. The term referred to cash coins with a denomination of 4 wén or higher.

Under the Xianfeng Emperor the government of the Qing dynasty faced large crises, most notably the Taiping Rebellion, which had heavily burdened the government's expenditures, as a response the government had introduced a large number of monetary reforms including the introduction of cash coins with high nominal values, while their intrinsic values were significantly lower. These cash coins were not well received by the Chinese public and their circulation was not long as the market would reject them rather quickly after their introduction. After 1855 all denominations of the Daqian other than the 10 wén ceased to be produced, while the 10 wén cash coins would continue to circulate at only 20% their nominal value.

Most Daqian were copper-alloy cash coins, but iron and lead Daqian were also produced during the Xianfeng era.

The Chinese Daqian happened concurrent with and may have inspired similar debasements of cash coinages in Tokugawa Japan, Joseon-era Korea, the Ryukyu islands, and Nguyễn-period Vietnam.

== History ==
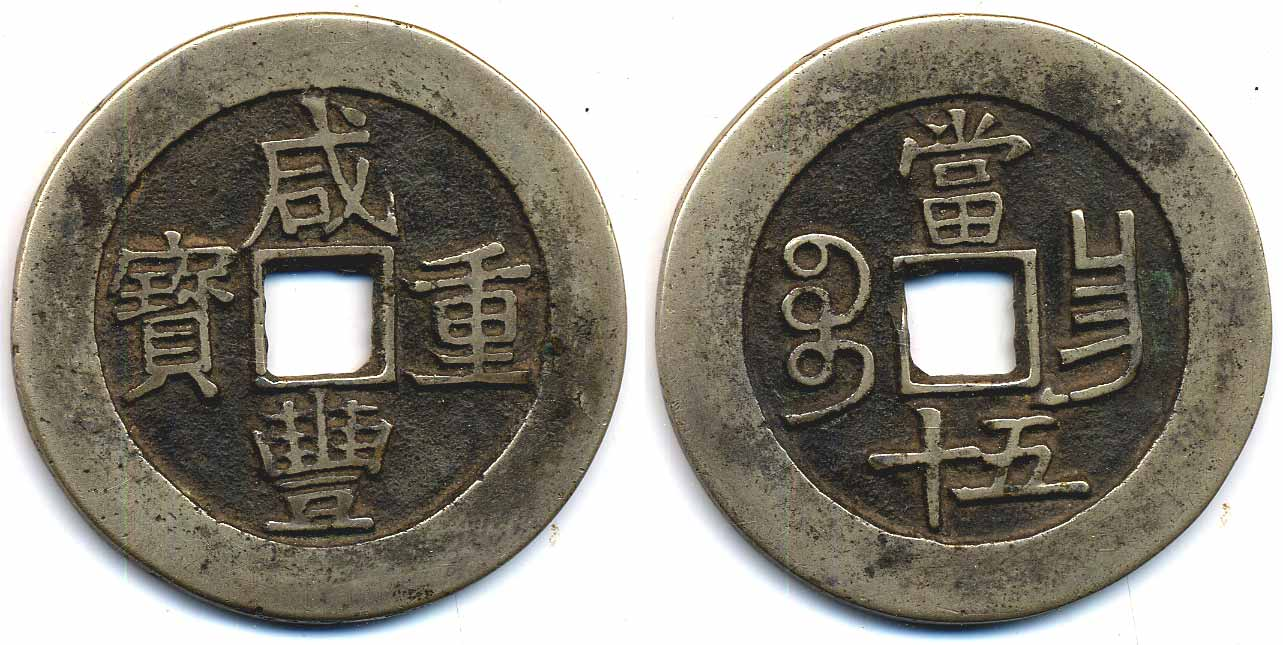
A Xianfeng Zhongbao (咸豐重寶) cash coin of 50 wén issued by the Jiangxi Mint.

=== Limited resources and background ===
A large number of large-scale peasant uprisings, ethnic and religious minority revolts, as well as foreign invasions of China took place under the reign of the Xianfeng Emperor, including Nian, Miao, Panthay, Red Turban, Da Cheng, and Taiping Rebellion, and the Second Opium War. These major events all had very devastating effects on the economy of the Qing dynasty as well as disabling the government of the Qing dynasty from collecting taxes. During the height of the Taiping Rebellion the government's access to its southern copper mines was cut off by rebel forces, this inability to access its copper reserves has a profound effect on the Qing dynasty coinage of this era. While initially like the preceding series of Qing era cash coins the Xianfeng Tongbao was only produced with the denomination of 1 wén, the government was soon forced to produce higher denominations to continue financing its large military expenditures.

=== Monetary policy debates during the Xianfeng era ===
After the Taiping rebels took Nanjing in 1853, serious debates about the monetary policy of the government of the Qing dynasty as the occupation of Southern China by the Taiping Heavenly Kingdom it cut off from several sources of revenue, including tax revenues, southern provincial grain tributes, the salt tax imposed on the Huai area, and the Yunnanese copper mines from which the copper supplies for the Beijing imperial mints came from. These circumstances led to both shortages in the imperial silver supply (from taxation) and the supply of copper-alloy cash coins. Various proposals were made to remedy the lowered government income and fiscal deficits, among these proposals the majority of them concerned monetary reforms. Among the suggestions were proposals for the indigenous production of silver so the Qing state would be less dependent on the influx of foreign silver dollars, but this proposal was met with much skepticism as it was quite difficult to set up silver mining and minting operations in China at the time, while other proposals called for the complete abolition of silver as a medium of exchange in China.

Other proposals sought to introduce gold and even jade to the Chinese monetary system and wanted to ban all non-religious usage of precious metals like gold and silver. The most influential proposals turned out to be the ones advocating for both the debasement of the copper coinage and the introduction of high denomination copper-alloy cash coins. Furthermore, some proposals recognised the difficulty of establishing multiple exchange rates between all the new monies and the high transaction costs that would burden low-value currencies such as the copper-alloy cash coins, these proposers advocated for the re-introduction of paper money, either convertible or inconvertible into metallic currencies.

While the government of the Qing dynasty was initially hesitant to adopt a new monetary policy, they settled on debasing the copper-alloy currency, issuing inconvertible banknotes, and establishing new government banks. In reality, the new monetarily policies were rushed and their implementation differed greatly from the actual proposals, furthermore the implementation would prove to be completely incoherent. Eventually the monetary policy of the Qing dynasty during the Xianfeng era had degenerated to forcing a debased copper-alloy currency on the Chinese people, while creating many obstacles that would prevent these new cash coins from ever returning to the government.

=== Introduction of new monies ===
The measures taken during the Taiping Rebellion made the Chinese monetary system even more complicated as it introduced a large number of different types of currency which all circulated concurrently as legal tender. The hyperinflation during the Xianfeng era was caused by the government of the Qing dynasty, in its desperate scramble for revenue, continuously debasing the copper content of its coinage. Furthermore, the banknotes it had issued were all declared to be inconvertible shortly after their issuance. The debasement of the copper content was commenced on 24 April of the year 1853 with the introduction of the Daqian (大錢, "big money").

Starting in April of the year 1853 two metropolitan mints commenced the production of the Daqian, the first series had a nominal value of 10 wén, these cash coins had a weight of 0.6 tael and their fineness was comparable to that of the Zhiqian (制錢, "standard cash coins"), this meant that the currency had been depreciated by about 50%.

The introduction of the 10 wén cash coin was only reluctantly accepted by the Chinese market, and it introduction had caused rampant counterfeiting of it. These counterfeits did not weigh as much as the government issued 10 wén Daqian. Furthermore, the Daqian were all intended to circulate side-by-side with the already existing currencies in China, and then be accepted at face value and the older coinage wasn't collected by the government for re-melting. Eventually the weight of the 10 wén cash coins was reduced to only 0.22 taels.

In the year 1854 new Daqian were introduced, these had denominations ranging from 5 wén to 1000 wén. During this same time the government of the Qing dynasty began issuing convertible cash bank notes, or guan-hao qianpiao (官號錢票), which were mostly backed in Daqian. These government-issued banknotes were modeled after private bank notes, known as sihao qianpiao (私號錢票), which would continue to circulate even after the introduction of these government notes. These banknotes were issued by nine different government banks, four of these banks newly established for their circulation. Both the Daqian and guan-hao qianpiao were calculated using the Jingqian (京錢) unit of account, but they were complicated by the fact that the nominal value of these government banknotes denominated the debt owed to be satisfied by the payment of cash coins.

To finance their enormous military expenditures the government took several monetary initiatives, the government introduced the Great Qing Treasure Note (大清寶鈔) copper-alloy cash-notes and the Hubu Guanpiao (戶部官票) silver tael-notes although the empire's silver reserves were woefully inadequate to back the new paper currency. The size and weight of the 1 wén Xianfeng Tongbao cash coins were reduced, this was done to save copper which was in short supply due to the supply lines from the copper mines of the Yunnan being disrupted by the wars that occurred in Southern China.

The large denominations of copper-alloy cash coins cast during the reign of the Xianfeng Emperor ranged were 4 wén, 5 wén, 10 wén, 20 wén, 30 wén, 40 wén, 50 wén, 80 wén, 100 wén, 200 wén, 500 wén, and 1000 wén. These Daqian were in no way standardised and it wasn't uncommon for a 50 wén cash coin produced by one mint to be both larger and heavier than a 100 wén cash coin produced by another mint, or a 100 wén cash coin produced by one mint to be both larger and heavier than a 1000 wén cash coin which was produced by another mint. This lack of difference between the denominations was significant because most of its users were illiterate and could therefore not distinguish between them.

Among the various mints that operated in China at the time, the Fuzhou mint was noted for casting a large number of varieties of these Daqian cash coins with local characteristics.

The introduction of the large denomination Xianfeng coinages happened concurrent with the Tenpō Tsūhō 100 mon coin issued by the Tokugawa shogunate in 1835 (in reaction to government deficit), the 100 mun coin, known as the Dangbaekjeon, by the Joseon Kingdom of Korea in 1867, the Ryukyuan 100 mon and half Shu cash coins, and the large denomination Tự Đức Bảo Sao cash coins in Vietnam. All of these large denomination cash coins also caused inflation on comparable levels.

The nominal value of both the Daqian and the guan-hao qianpiao did not reflect reality, as for example in the year 1861 one would get only 7,500 wén in cash coins (or 750 10 wén cash coins) when cashing in government-issued cash notes of 15,000 wén. Furthermore, unlike physical cash coins, the "string of cash coins" currency unit, or diào (吊), was used to represent 1000 wén in government documents, but only 500 physical cash coins were paid out per paper string. In the year 1854 as the copper reserves of the Qing dynasty were being depleted the government of the Qing dynasty began issuing iron Daqian known as tieqian (鐡錢). The process under which the Xianfeng inflation unfolded revealed as much about the capacity of the government of the Qing dynasty to coerce as the constraint in its monetary management. Only a few years after the introduction of the above currencies, they would all start being heavily discounted on the market.

An example of a common Xianfeng era Daqian would weigh as much as two standard cash coins, giving it an intrinsic value of 2 wén, while having a stamped value equivalent to ten wén.

The inconvertible paper notes that were also issued and pushed through the Chinese market received the full coercive power of the central state. These monetary policies led to immediate market reaction in the areas where they circulated, in fact, upon rumour, would cause the closure of local money shops and was behind a capital flight out of the capital city of Beijing. Public distrust in China towards these new monies even worsened when in the end, governmental agencies refused to accept "big cash" as a form of payment.

=== Inflation and depreciation ===
Peng Zeyi has distinguished three distinct phases of the Inflationary cycle during the Xianfeng inflation. First was the introduction and gradual depreciation of the new monies which was followed by a financial crash in early 1857, when standard cash, or Zhiqian (制錢), started disappearing from the Chinese market (Gresham's law), and finally the new monies suffering a steeper depreciation which was linked to a high price inflation.

Because copper-alloy cash coins had very little value, they were unlikely to be used as a store of value, and because moving them was very heavy and expensive, copper-alloy cash coins were also not used that often for long-distance trade due to their inconvenience. This meant that when large-denomination cash coins were overvalued, the Chinese people were far more likely to melt them down for counterfeiting than try to export them to other regions. This also made it more likely for the copper-alloy cash coins that originated from the regions in close proximity to Beijing to send their cash coins to the city to be melted into counterfeit Daqian.

Only a few years after their introduction, both the Daqian and the government-issued paper money would start to be steeply discounted on the Chinese commercial markets. Daqian at this time would start to be traded at their intrinsic value rather than their nominal value. Because of their low intrinsic value and general inconvenience, all Daqian with denominations higher than 50 wén were discontinued within a year of their introduction.

Very briefly after its introduction, the 10 wén cash coins were only accepted at 30% their nominal value, this downward spiral continued until it had reached only 20% of its nominal value (2 wén) on the Chinese market.

Both the Daqian and paper currencies proved to be short-lived solutions for the government of the Qing dynasty, with the acceptance of the Daqian coinage having ended within three or four years from its inception. In the capital Beijing, this change would simply translate into a permanent nominal adjustment in the units of accounts used within the city, with a one-time jump in the nominal price level increasing it fivefold based on the Daqian units.

Both the inflationary policy of debasing the copper currencies and the issuance of inconvertible paper money were also largely confined to the Beijing capital region and the immediate neighbouring provinces, this was due to the Qing government's limited political control over much of China at the time of Taiping Rebellion. During this era the introduction of the "big cash coins" unit in the capital city made interregional a lot more difficult to conduct because of the regional currency units that existed.

=== After 1855 ===
After the year 1855 only the 10 wén Daqian would continue to be produced, but they would circulate at heavily discounted rate.

=== Qixiang era / Tongzhi era ===
During the early years of the Tongzhi Emperor he used the reign title "Qixiang" (祺祥) and 10 wén Daqian continued to be produced, for a brief period of time Daqian with the inscription Qixiang Zhongbao (祺祥重寶) were produced. Because the Qixiang era name wasn't used for that long, cash coins with this era date were cast for such a short time, that only a small number of the government mints produced cash coins with this inscription. These mints included the Ministry of Public Works Mint (寶源), the Ministry of Revenue Mint (寶泉), the Yunnan mint (寶雲), the Gansu mint (寶鞏), and the Suzhou mint (寶蘇).

When the regnal name changed to Tongzhi, the government mints withdrew or destroyed the mother coins that contained the Qixiang inscriptions and then engraved new mother coins to produce cash coins with the inscriptions Tongzhi Tongbao (同治通寶) and Tongzhi Zhongbao (同治重寶). Both Tongzhi Tongbao and Tongzhi Zhongbao Daqian were cased.

In the year 1867 the official weight of the Daqian was reduced from 4.4 qián to 3.2 qián, these Daqian were only valued at 3 Zhiqian cash coins on the market.

=== Guangxu era ===
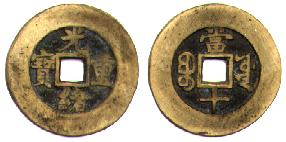
A Guangxu Zhongbao (光緒重寶) cash coin of 10 wén.

In the year 1883 the imperial government of the Qing dynasty made an attempt to restore the copper-alloy cash coins back to their original units, because the new units had created chaos among private money shops in China who were willing to pay premium copper-alloy cash coins to call back their own privately produced banknotes that were issued in "Beijing cash" (Jingqian) units. This was done out of a fear of the large capital cost of having to later redeem their banknotes that were based on the previous standards of copper-alloy cash coins.

Until the year 1890 the imperial government mints in Beijing continued producing Guangxu Zhongbao (光緒重寶) Daqian of 10 wén, until they were superseded by the Great Qing Copper Coin coins which would fulfil the same role in the monetary system of China.

== Five Metal Value Ten coins ==
Five Metal Value Ten coins are Chinese cash coins that were issued by the Ministry of Revenue made from an alloy of tin, iron, copper, silver, and gold. They contain the obverse inscriptions Tongzhi Zhongbao (同治重寶) or Guangxu Zhongbao (光緒重寶) and are all based on 10 wén Daqian. These special cash coins notably contain the mint marks of Fujian, Guangdong, Guangxi, Guizhou, Ili, Jiangsu, Jiangxi, Hubei, Hunan, Shanxi, Shaanxi, Sichuan, Yunnan, Zhejiang, and Zhili despite no Daqian from these periods being produced at any of these mints. These special cash coins were created to serve as a new year's present.

== Banknotes denominated in Daqian ==
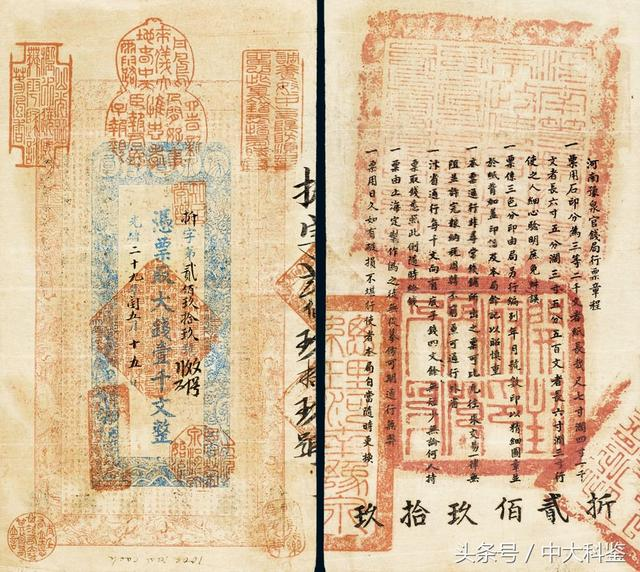
A 500 wén (伍百文) banknote issued by the Yuquan Official Money Bureau (豫泉官錢局) in the year Guangxu 27 (1901) denominated in "Daqian".

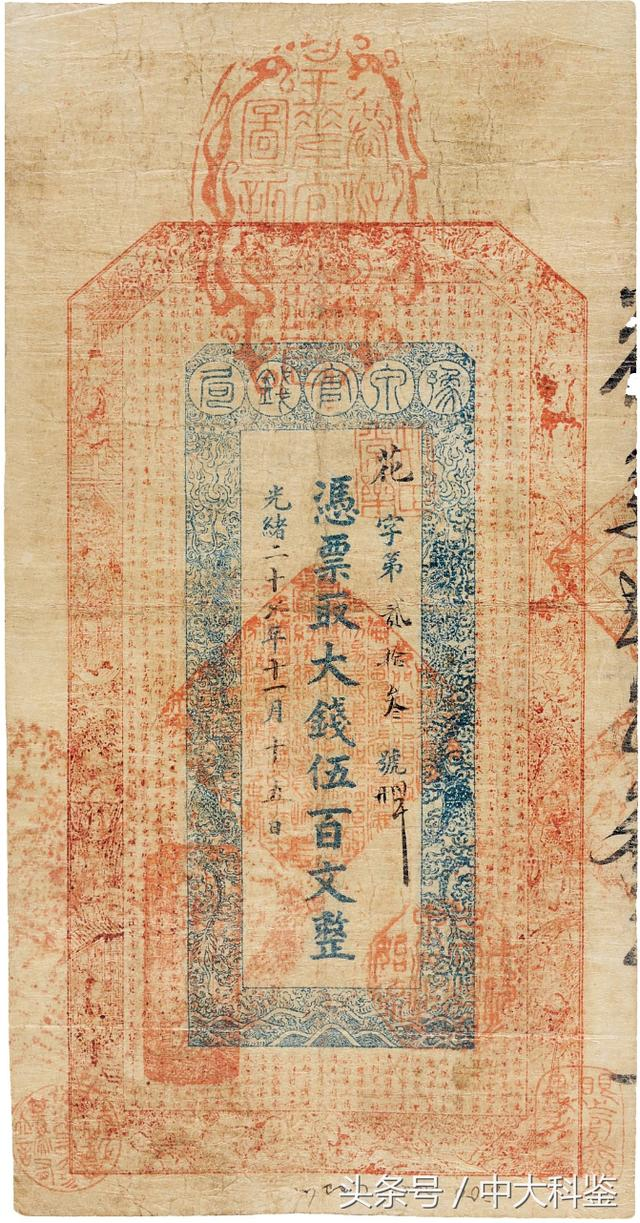
A 500 wén (伍百文) banknote issued by the Yuquan Official Money Bureau (豫泉官錢局) in the year Guangxu 27 (1901) denominated in "Daqian".

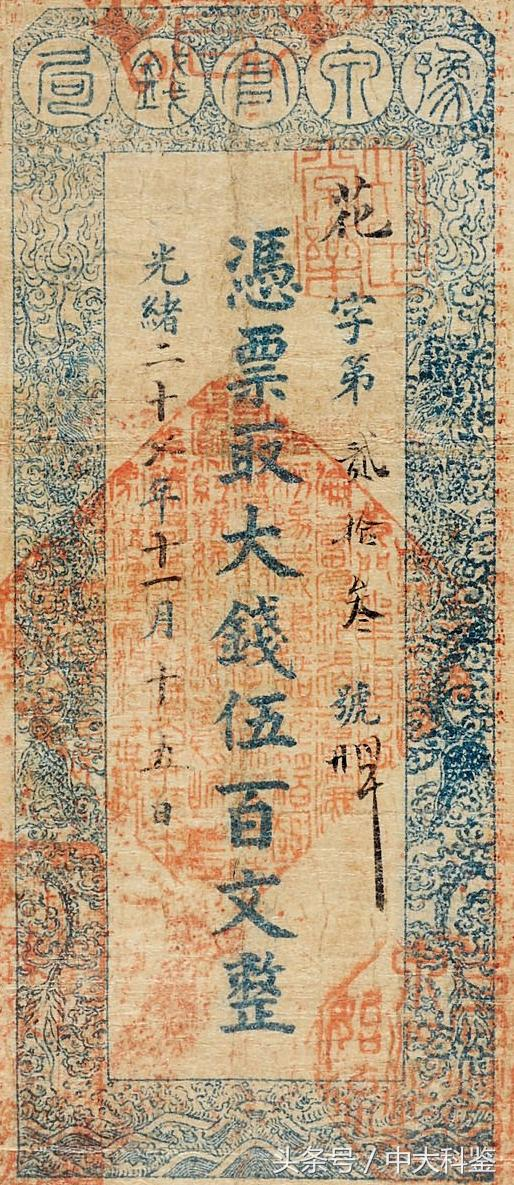
A 500 wén (伍百文) banknote issued by the Yuquan Official Money Bureau (豫泉官錢局) in the year Guangxu 27 (1901) denominated in "Daqian".

== See also ==
- Dangojeon
- Dangbaekjeon
- Vietnamese văn (currency unit)

== Sources ==
- Hartill, David (2005). Cast Chinese Coins: A Historical Catalogue. Trafford. ISBN 978-1-4120-5466-9.
- Hartill, David, Qing cash, Royal Numismatic Society Special Publication 37, London, 2003.
- Peng, Xinwri (彭信威) (2007) [1954]. Zhongguo huobi shi 中國貨幣史. Shanghai: Qunlian chubanshe 5. pp. 80–581, 597–605. (in Mandarin Chinese).
- Peng Xinwei (彭信威) (1994) A monetary history of China (translated by Edward H. Kaplan). Western Washington University (Bellingham, Washington).
