= Zhuangpiao =

Historical Chinese banknotes

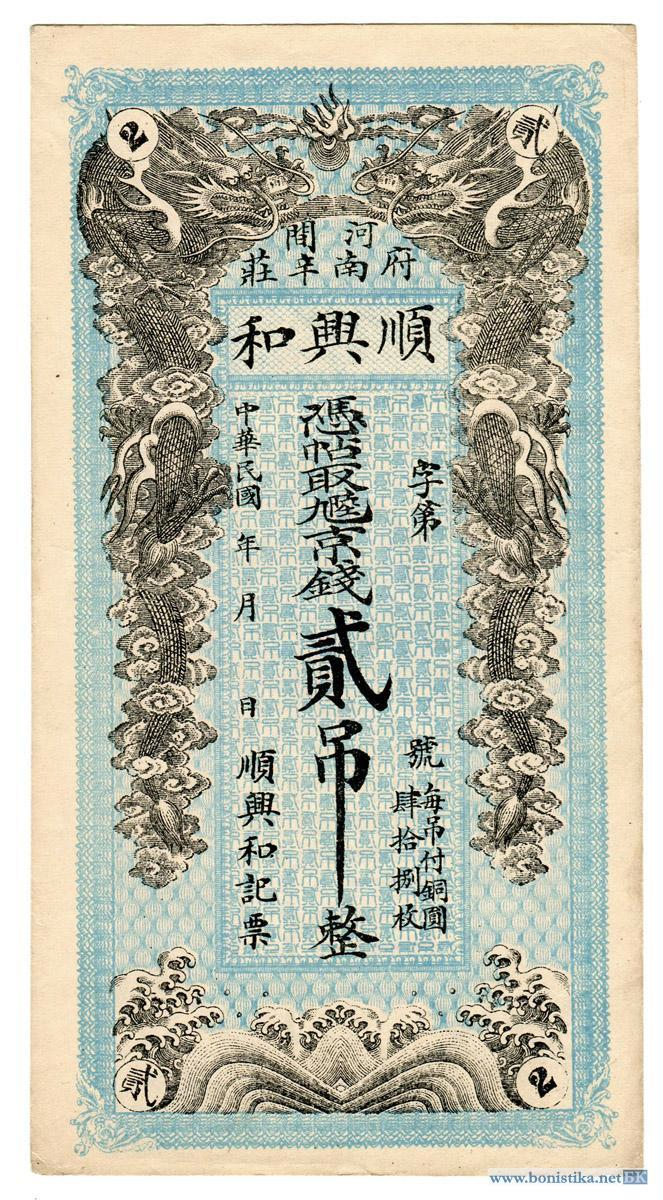
An undated zhuangpiao (specifically named as a pingtie) of 2 tiao (in Jingqian) issued by the Shun Xing He private bank during the early Republic of China.

The Zhuangpiao (Chinese: 莊票), alternatively known as Yinqianpiao (銀錢票, "silver money notes"), Huipiao (會票, "corporate notes"), Pingtie (憑帖), Duitie (兌帖), Shangtie (上帖), Hupingtie (壺瓶帖), or Qitie (期帖) in different contexts, refer to privately produced paper money (or company scrip) made in China during the Qing dynasty and early Republic of China periods issued by small private banks known as qianzhuang. Other than banknotes qianzhuang also issued Tiexian (貼現, "discountable notes").

A qianzhuang would issue a zhuangpiao after receiving a deposit and these notes could generally also be cashed in at other qianzhuang after they were confirmed to be genuine specimens by checking the banknote seals. zhuangpiao served as de facto banknotes in China during periods when the government had long stopped issuing them and were an alternative currency when government banknotes such as the Great Qing Treasure Note and Hubu Guanpiao were later introduced and abolished.

Early zhuangpiao were generally denominated either cash coins (or strings thereof) represented by the currency unit of wén (文), or in the tael (兩) silver weight unit. Later zhuangpiao would also feature denominations such as the yuan (元 / 圓) which was based on round silver coins.

== Concept ==
Zhuangpiao were privately produced notes issued by qianzhuang private banks (or "native banks").

There were several differences between zhuangpiao and modern banknotes, the credit of modern banknotes come from the power of the state, but zhuangpiao served purely to convert metal coinages into paper money. An advantage which the zhuangpiao had for the Chinese economy as it would save the amount of money that was circulating and help facilitate more cross-regional trade across China. There issues associated with the zhuangpiao as faraway qianzhuang couldn't always verify them, it was more convenient for qianzhuang to let a zhuangpiao circulate in different places or in the same city and only be accepted and admitted by local qianzhuang there and these local qianzhuang needed a local place for exchange and debit within the city or region.

The Shanghai qianzhuang guild had an intricate system of exchanging zhuangpiao and the note would play its scale effect that was an equivalent to expanding the operating funds of the qianzhuang, this effect was similar to the money multiplier effect of modernised commercial banks in monetary economics. As a result of the transfer and rolling of accounts in this exchange, there had to be imbalances in expenditures, some qianzhuang need to pay the cash, and some qianzhuang was needed to recover the cash. If a qianzhuang did not have enough cash in its reserve to pay for the zhuangpiao and would need to borrow money from another qianzhuang in a short-term loan. To remedy this situation many local qianzhuang guilds set up interbank lending market systems to provide for things such as adjustment and allowed for member qianzhuang to have a buffer for the times that they wouldn't have sufficient funds to pay out the zhuangpiao they had issued. This interbank lending system was of great convenience for the daily operations of a qianzhuang.

== History ==
=== Qing dynasty ===
Many qianzhuang issued their own scrip known as zhuangpiao (莊票) and (if denominated in silver) yinqianpiao (銀錢票, "silver money notes"). This scrip was also accepted by proximate shops but to cash these out would take around 10–15 days after it was given to the shop, this was because couriers would have to liaise with the issuing shop in order to verify their authenticity and rule out fraudulent zhuangpiao notes.

The qianzhuang had employed some rather strict rules and regulations on their negotiable instruments such as the zhuangpiao. An example would be that when the Shunkang Qianzhuang receives a banknote issued by the Hongsheng Qianzhuang, the first thing that the Shunkang Qianzhuang would do is to send the old secretary or apprentice to the Hongsheng Qianzhuang to confirm the authenticity of the banknote. When the secretary or apprentice delivers the bill he would hold return book, this book indicates the number of produced banknotes. After this the important staff members of the Hongsheng Qianzhuang check to see if there are no problems with the note, they check you see if the Hongsheng Qianzhuang stamps on the left or right corner of the note are correct. If a note has been authenticated the issuing bank must always cash it in. To all qianzhuang a zhuangpiao is regarded the same as cash money (or a "promissory non-recogniser") and they had a very trustful relationship with each other.

When the Great Qing Treasure Note (大清寶鈔) cash notes were suffering from inflation privately produced zhuangpiao cash notes were valued at double the nominal value of these government-issued cash notes, a number which increased to three and a half times as much before they were finally abolished in 1859.

During this era Chinese banknotes had a lot of different currency units and almost every small region had their own regional currency with regional standards, Dr. Wen Pei Wei, in his 1914 book "The Currency Problem in China", stated "of a currency system it can be seen that China currently has none... No one single unit of currency in the Chinese system, if it can be called that, serves the function [of standard of value] for the country as a whole." This was reflected in the zhuangpiao by the fact that many different currency units were traded based on the market rates and their relation to each other rather than using a standardised currency system as is customary in other countries.

In order to establish an intra-city remittance and lending market, qianzhuang guilds established inter-city and inter-bank remittance houses to support the zhuangpiao that were issued by other qianzhuang.

During the late 19th century zhuangpiao banknotes were a common method of payment in the credit business of Shanghai and were both accepted by local and foreign banks. The Qianzhuang would mobilise their domestic resources to an order of magnitude that would exceed the paid-up capital that they initially received several times over, this happened mostly through issuing banknotes and deposit receipts. British banks operating in China would often accept zhuangpiao as a security for the loans they gave out to qianzhuang. This makes it plausible that chop loans originated because of the widely used prevalence of zhuangpiao in China that British banks could simply not just to reject them when they were being offered to them by foreign merchants in China. During this era foreign banking companies tended to have an account at least one qianzhuang, since only the guilds operated by them could clear the large number zhuangpiao forms that were circulating in the city of Shanghai, this happened through a rather elaborate daily mechanism which was dubbed Huihua (非匯, "draft exchange"). The huihuazhuang credit banks of Shanghai enjoyed special privileges over the smaller banks such as the right to both issue and to accept yinpiao (銀票, "silver notes") denominated in silver taels and qianpiao (錢票, "cash notes") denominated in copper-alloy cash coins. The huihuazhuang credit banks also operated deposits and issued various types of paper money such as the discountable notes known as tiexian (貼現), furthermore they also issued their own banknotes (zhuangpiao) and bills of exchange (which were known as huipiao (匯票, "remittance notes").

When the chop loan mechanism collapsed this severely affected the standing of zhuangpiao, much like all the other organic, private-order arrangements were badly hit, in a negative way on the monetary Chinese market. These private arrangements often concerned the individual intermediaries which were employed by foreign banks and financial institutions to guarantee Chinese liabilities like the zhuangpiao notes, the intermediary business rose up during the mid-19th century in Chinese treaty ports in response to both language barriers and information deficits facing foreigners who wished to do business in local Chinese markets. These intermediaries were commonly known as "compradors" to Westerners or maiban in Mandarin Chinese. Compradors would personally guarantee the value of zhuangpiao issued by the qianzhuang and other Chinese liabilities before foreign institutions, but they did not actually have the leverage to guarantee any metallic money, such as the silver coins, disbursed by foreign institutions in the Chinese (monetary) marketplace. As China was suffering from a highly fractured monetary condition, this enabled the rise other highly specialised financial organisations precisely to that end, which were the gonguju and yinlu metal assayers.

Chinese historian Peng Xinwei stated that in the year 1900 privately produced banknotes made up only 3% of the total volume of Chinese currency stock.

The Hupeh Provincial Bank (湖北官錢局, Hubei Guan-Qianju), a provincial government-owned qianzhuang issued their own banknotes which were known as the Hubei Guanpiao (湖北官票), these banknotes were denominated in taels for silver and strings for copper-alloy cash coins. The Hubei Guanpiao had magistrate seals affixed on them as endorsements, as the zhuangpiao by the local qianzhuang formerly practiced. In March of the year 1901 Zhang Zhidong commanded his subordinates to repudiate those magistrate seals on the Hubei Guanpiao banknotes that were issued as Zhang forthrightly explained to them that his foreign-made printing machines applied anti-forgery techniques, and that acquiescing seals would hamper circulating and competing banknotes issued by modern banks in China.

In the year 1906 the regulations of the North and South city money industry reorganisation stipulated that when zhuangpiao expired that if unfamiliar people would request their zhuangpiao to be cashed in, the qianzhuang would refuse to pay into 12:00 post meridiem, this was in accordance to the general rules and regulations of the Chinese financial market at the time.

If the note was discounted as an unexpired zhuangpiao, all of the brought in notes would need to be carefully identified.

=== Republic of China ===
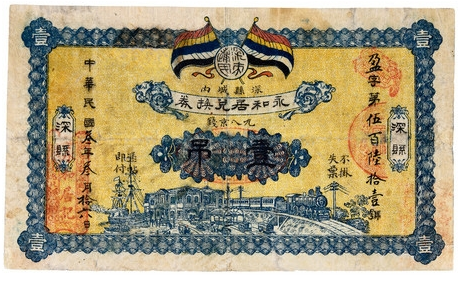
A 1915 (民國三年) zhuangpiao of 1 tiao (or 98 Jingqian) issued by the Yonghe Residence Co., Ltd.

The Hubei Guanpiao was abolished in 1927 with the bankruptcy of the Hubei Guan-Qianju. After the Hubei Guan-Qianju filed for bankruptcy in 1927 35 million strings in Hubei Guanpiao banknotes, which accounted for about half of the total of Hubei Guanpiao issued, were lost in the lengthy recall process by the defunct banks, as these banknotes had become completely worthless.

In the year 1933 the government of the Republic of China abolished the ancient silver-based currency unit, the tael and completely replaced it with the yuan in a process known as the fei liang gai yuan (廢兩改元). During this time the Republican government cleared all banknotes denominated in the ancient tael currency, making all bills which used this currency unit obsolete.

Following the 1935 currency reform the government of the Republic of China introduced the fabi (法幣, "legal tender"), from November of the year 1935 to December 1936, the 3 officially sanctioned note-issuing banks issued the new paper currency, the fabi was completely detached from the silver standard. The Central Government of the Republic of China had enacted these currency reforms to limit currency issuance to three major government-controlled banks: the Bank of China, Central Bank of China, Bank of Communications, and later the Farmers Bank of China. Chinese people were required by government mandate to hand in all of their current silver reserves in return for the newly introduced fabi, this was primarily done by the government in order to supply the silver that the Chinese government owed to the United States. The Chinese government and the central bank were careful to do a controlled release of about 2,000,000,000 yuan worth of new fabi banknotes, this was done in order to prevent inflation, and the government had taken many precautions to distribute these banknotes both gradually and fairly. In the first few months following the release of the fabi banknotes, the Chinese government did this to wait to see whether the Chinese public would place their trust in the new, unified Chinese currency.

== How qianzhuang dealt with missing or stolen zhuangpiao ==
If someone reported the loss or theft of one of their zhuangpiao to a qianzhuang the qianzhuang would stop issuing payments out to that note. This is because if the qianzhuang would pay for the zhuangpiao at sight the customer would have lost their money, but on the other hand if the qianzhuang would refuse to pay out a banknote without any conclusive evidence then this can easily lead to the loss of credit for qianzhuang. Because of the associated risks the qianzhuang had created a large number of detailed provisions specifically for the situation where they would have to suspend paying out a zhuangpiao because its loss had been reported.

"when the dealer come to Qianzhuang with the intention to ask for suspension of payment by reporting loss, if the ticket has been paid, or has been used to buy goods, or has been discounted, and there are accounts to be recorded, and goods to be pointed out, then we can be sure that ticket entries into others’ hands, or is stolen by self-theft, or there are other situations, no matter when, Qianzhuang shall not agree to any suspension of payment by reporting the loss of the ticket."

- Pan Liangui, The History of Shanghai Money (Second Edition), Shanghai People's Publishing House, 2015.

If the zhuangpiao was in fact truly irretrievable because of situations like water damage, fire, or theft, then the customer who had lost their zhuangpiao was obligated to issue a certificate confirming the fact and then give this certificate to the local qianzhuang to apply for a suspension. Afterwards the person who lost their zhuangpiao had to report on it and declare it publicly in a famous local newspaper and one abroad as well as to report its loss to the local authorities such as the government, this would temporarily suspend payment of the lost zhuangpiao. The money owed would then be sent to the local qianzhuang guild where it would be kept safe. If 100 days had passed and no credible objections had been made against the loss the loser would then receive their money.

== Seals, overprints, and endorsements ==
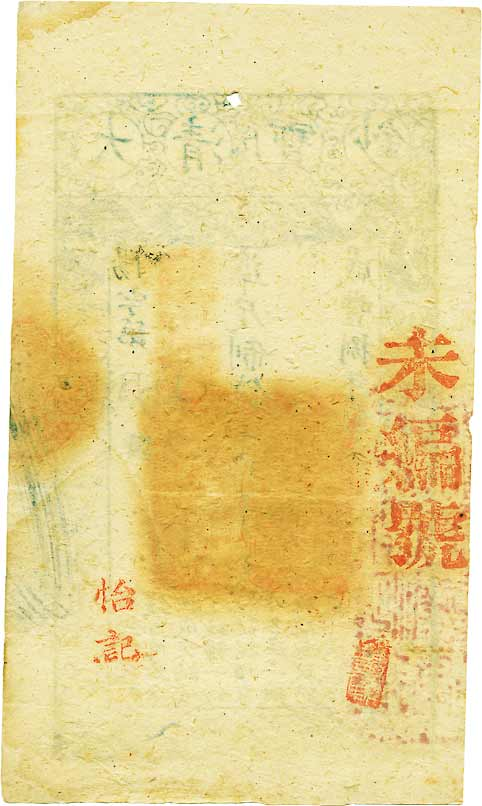
The names of various qianzhuang stamped on the reverse side of a Great Qing Treasure Note (大清寶鈔) banknote, such endorsements were common on zhuangpiao.

Three kinds of stamps were used on Chinese banknotes including zhuangpiao, these were "seals", "overprints", and "endorsements". In general, seals were affixed by the issuing office or private bank. Overprints were added later after the banknote had already been placed into general circulation, overprints were the products of semi-officials who had some nominal form of authority the merchant class did not have. Endorsements represent acceptance of Chinese banknotes as genuine and were generally placed on the reverse side (or blank side) of the banknote by the many qianzhuang (such as "cash shops", T'ien shops, and money changers) through whose hands they would pass. The official seals which were placed on Qing dynasty era banknotes tended to serve a large variety of purposes.

== Gallery ==
Gallery
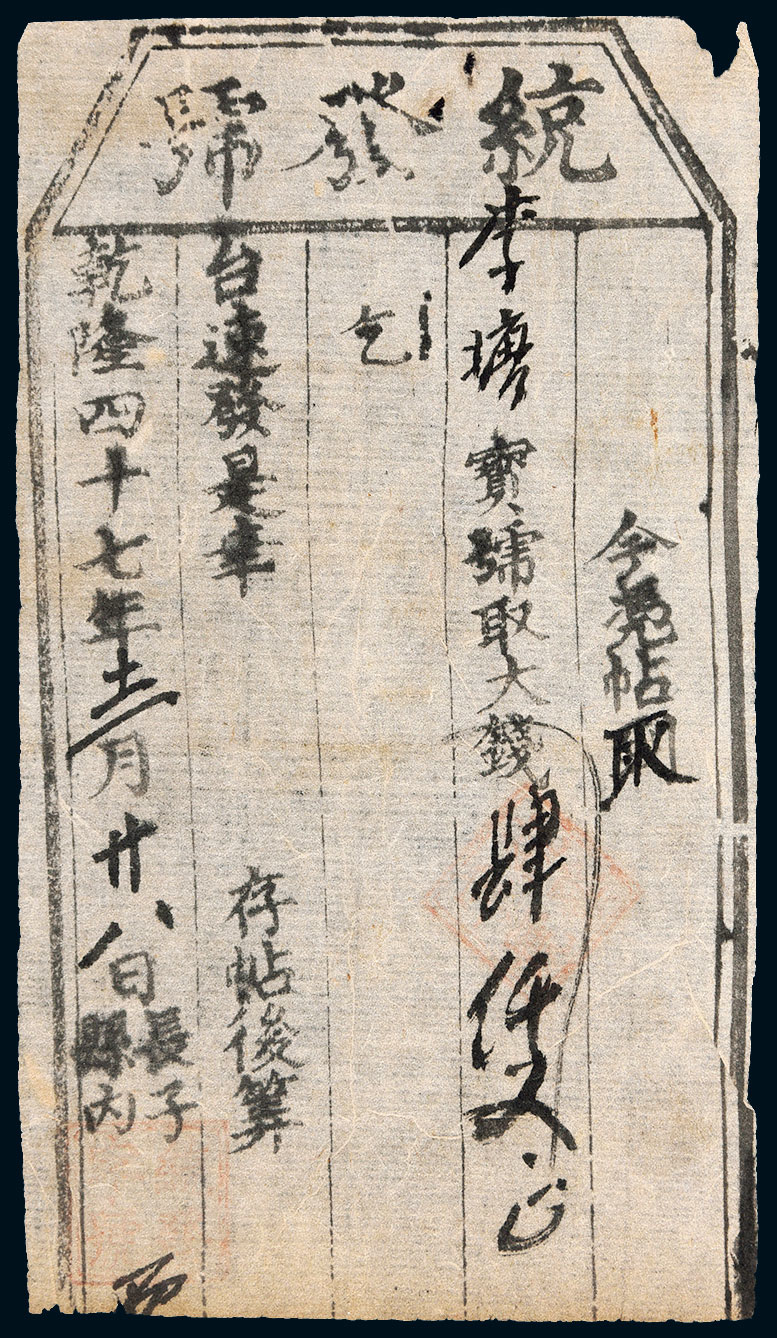
A banknote of 1000 wén issued by the Tongfa Money Shop in the year Qianlong 47 (1782).

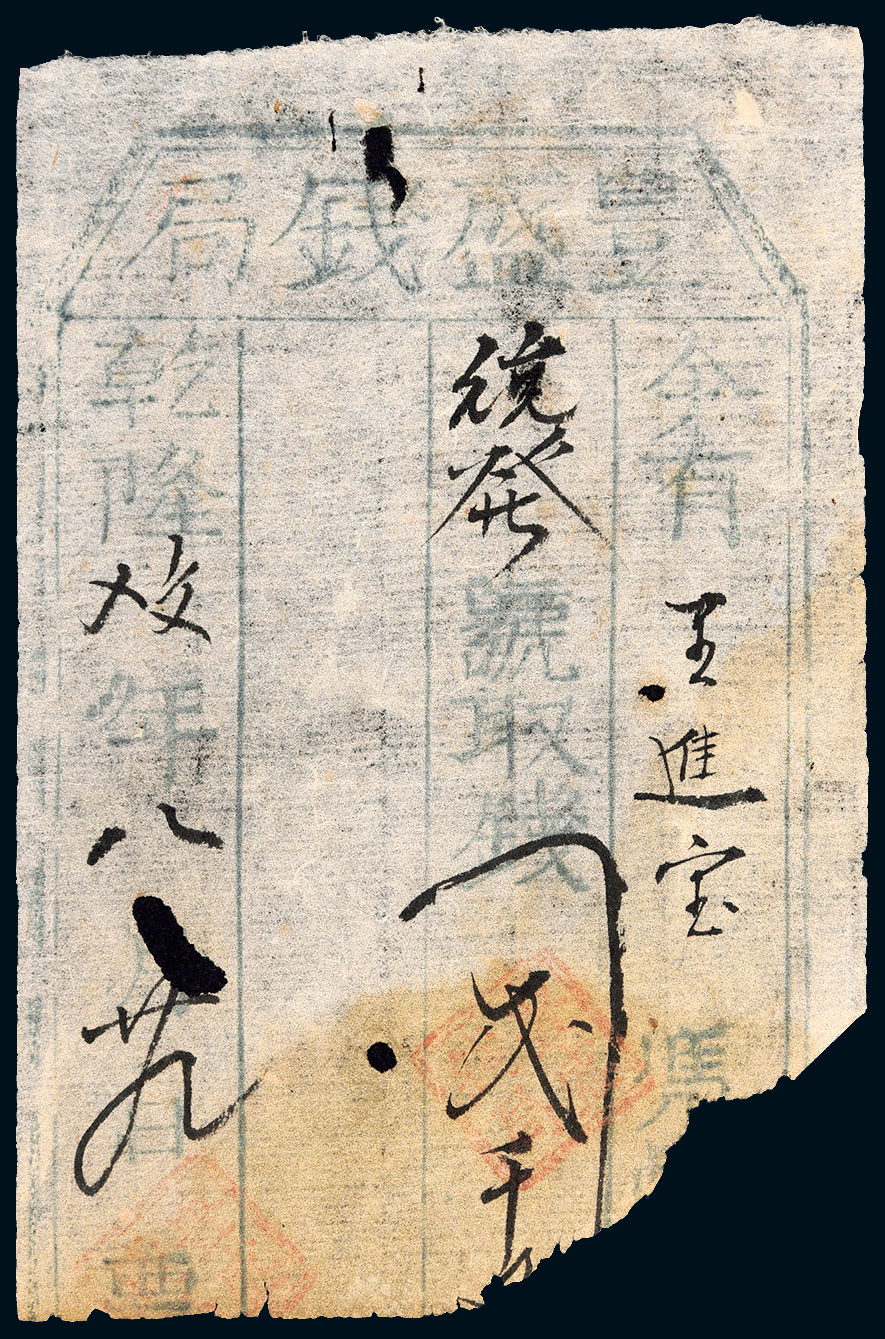
A banknote of 2000 wén issued by the Fengsheng Money Shop in the year Qianlong 49 (1784).

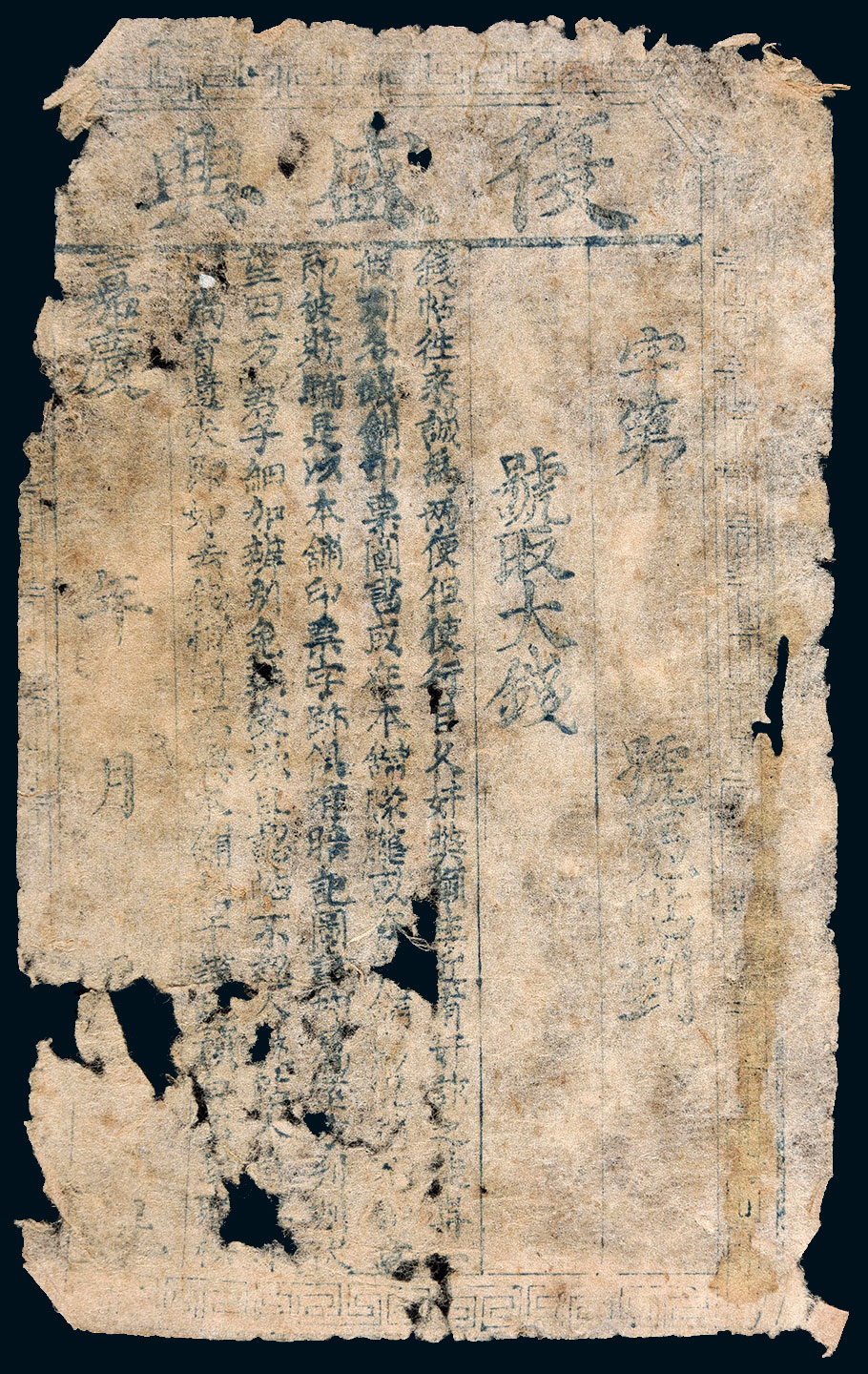
A blank and undated banknote from the Qianlong era.

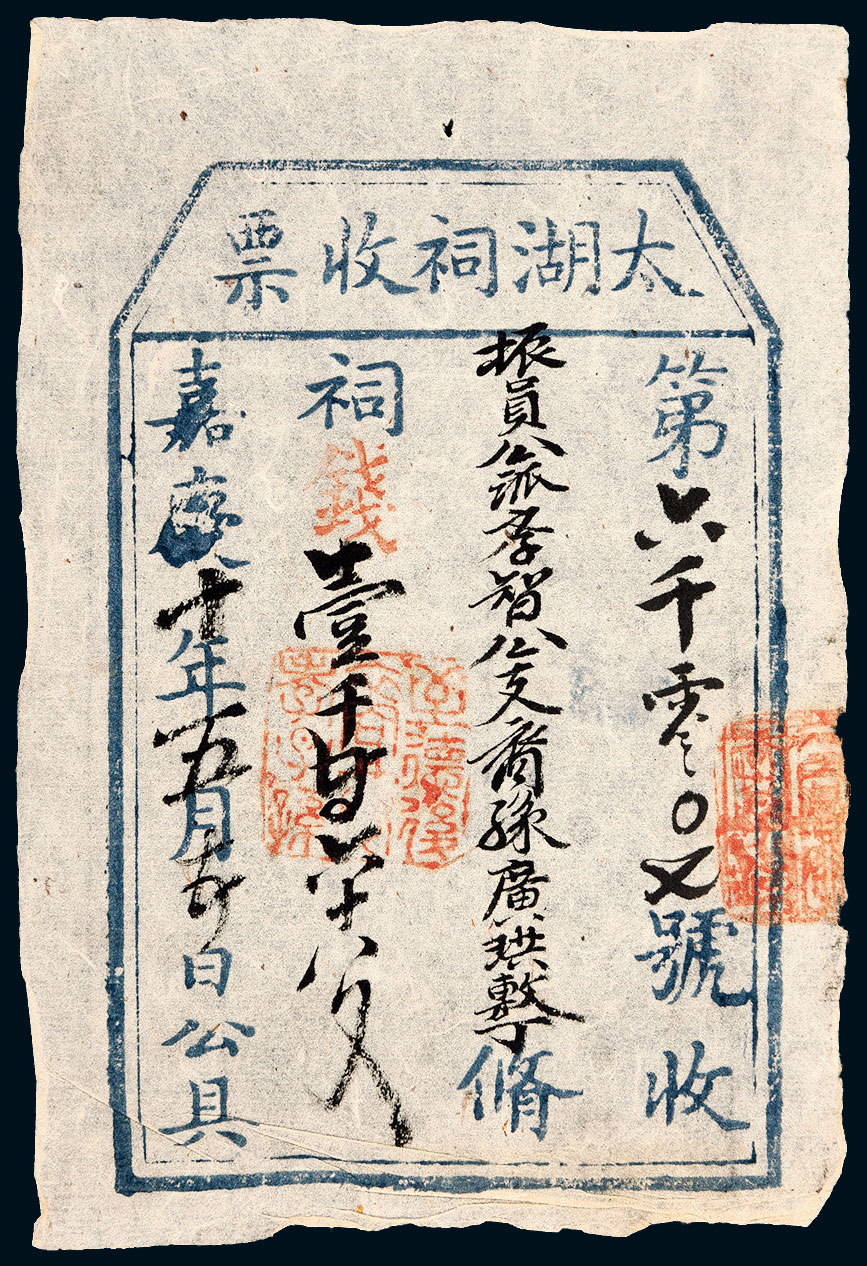
A Zhuangpiao banknote of 1068 wén issued by the Lake Tai ancestral temple in the year Jiaqing 10 (1805).

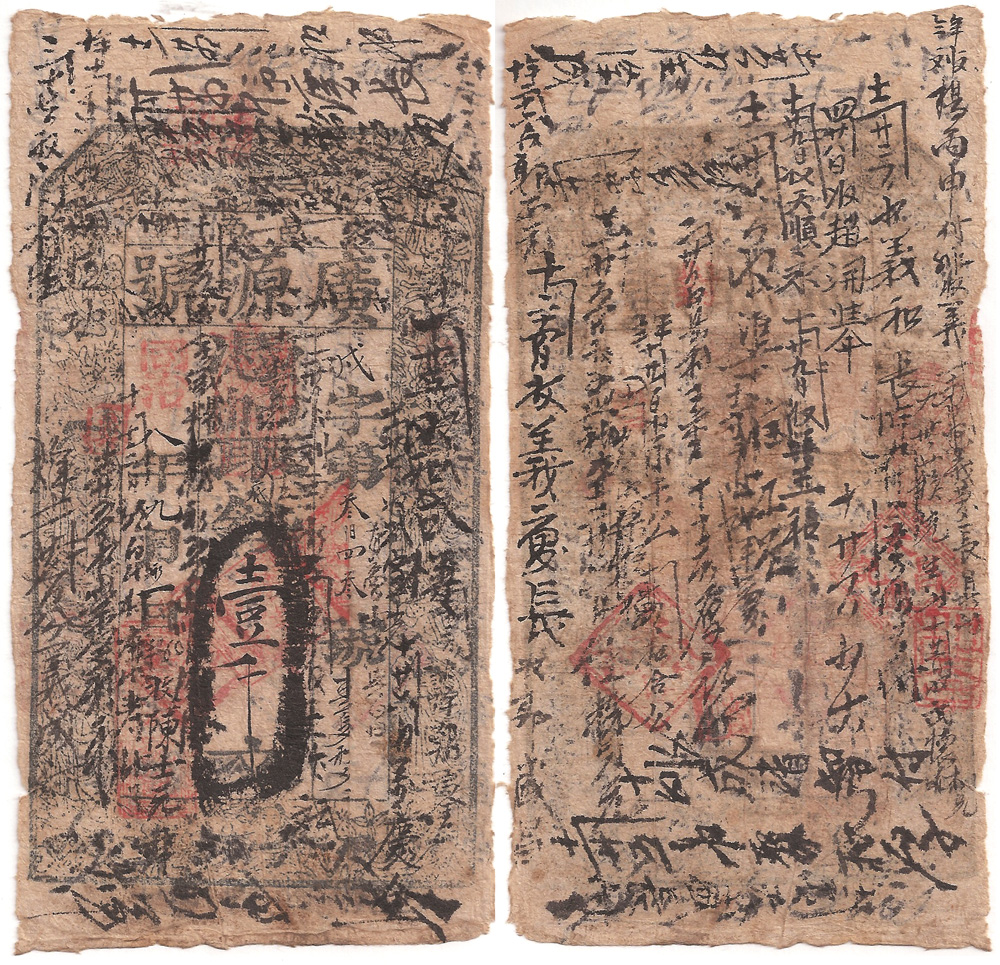
A banknote of 1000 wén issued by the Guang Yuan Hao in the year Tongzhi 8 (1871).

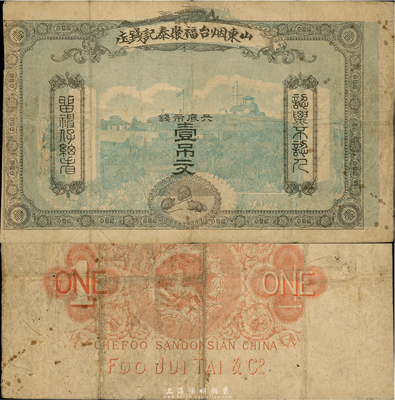
A banknote of 1 diào wén (吊文) issued by the Foo Ju Tai & Company from the Shandong province under the reign of the Guangxu Emperor.

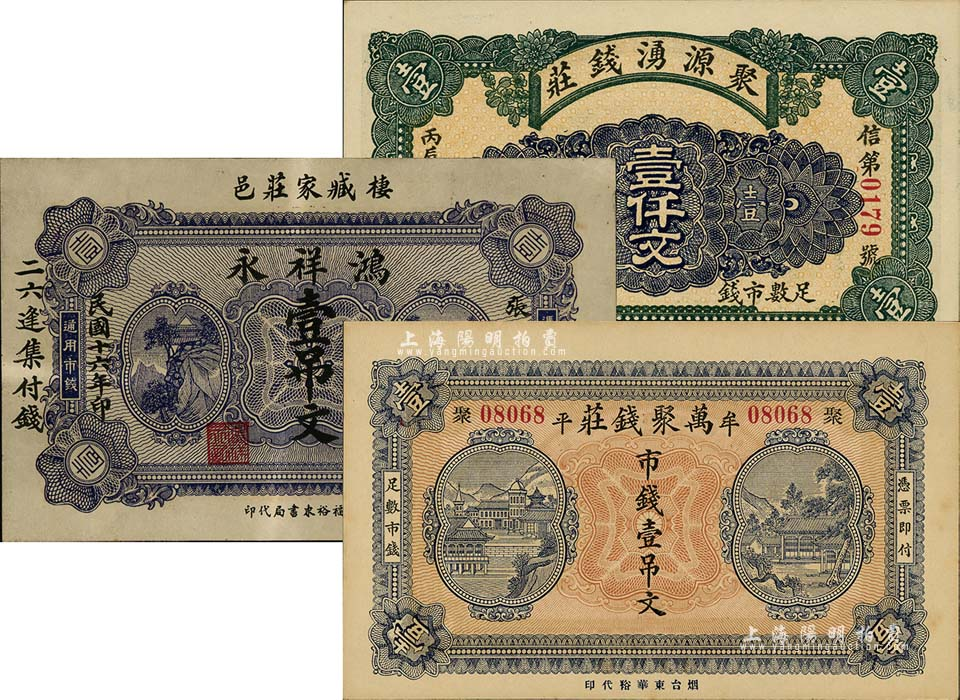
Private banknotes issued by Shandong private banks in 1916.

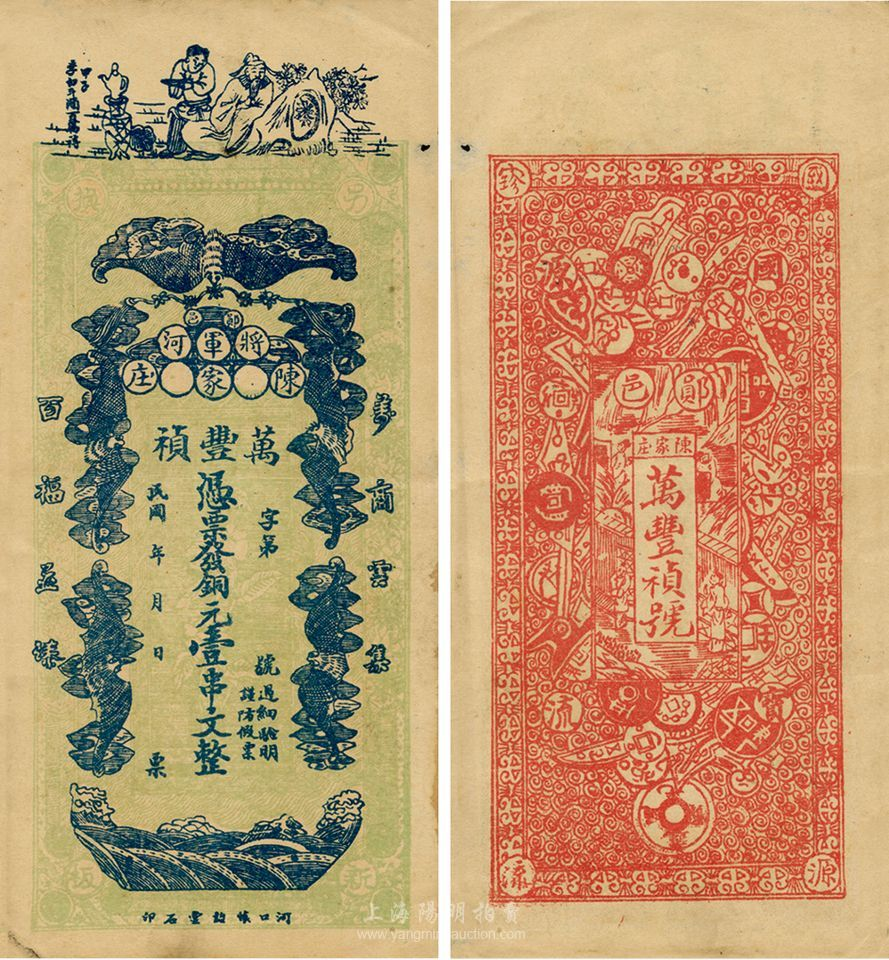
A Chinese zhuangpiao banknote of 1 chuàn wén (串文) issued by the Wan Fen Zhen Money Shop.

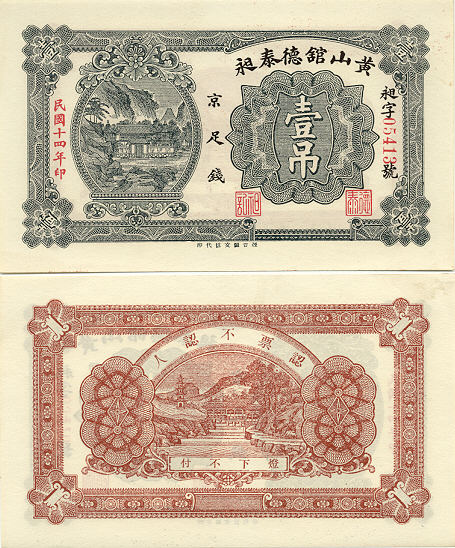
A banknote of 1 Tiao (吊) issued by the Huan Shan in the year 1925.

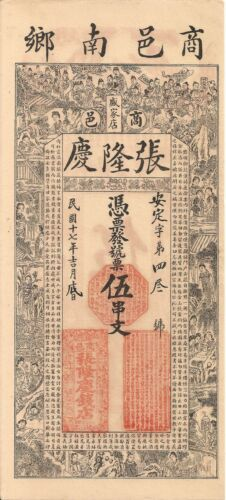
A private Chinese banknote of 5 chuàn wén (串文) issued by the Zhang Long Qing in the year 1928.

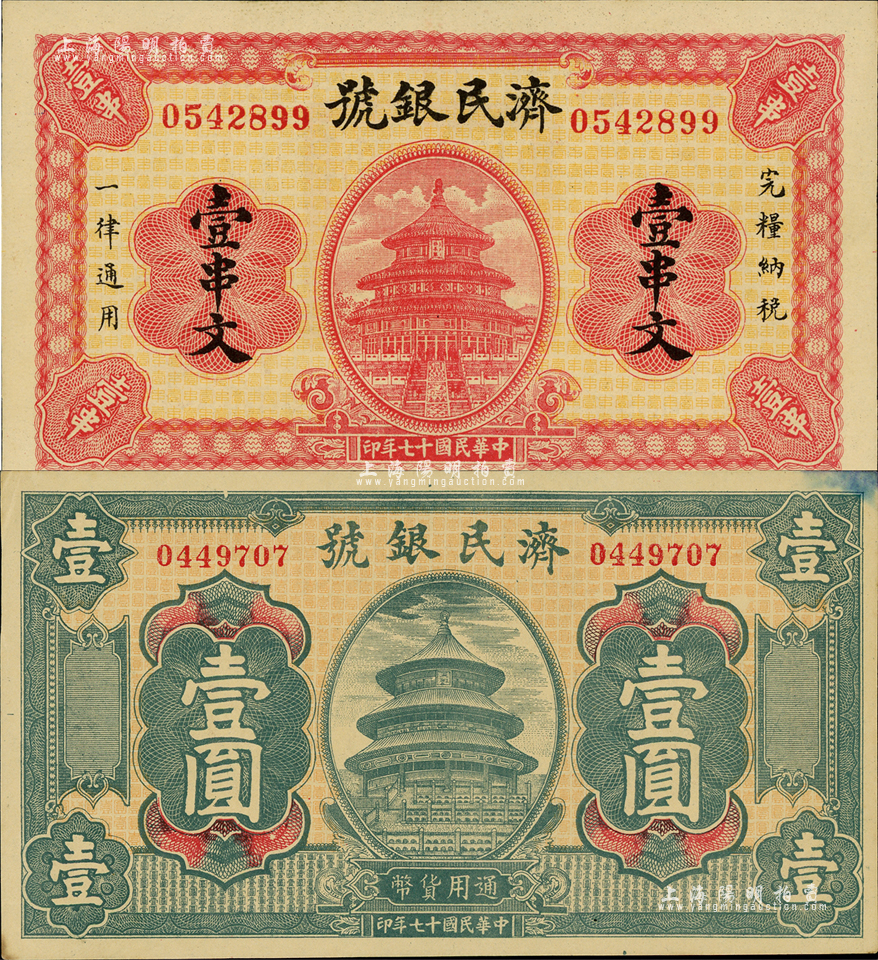
Private banknotes of 1 chuàn wén (串文) and 1 yuan (圓) issued by the Jimin Bank in the year 1928.

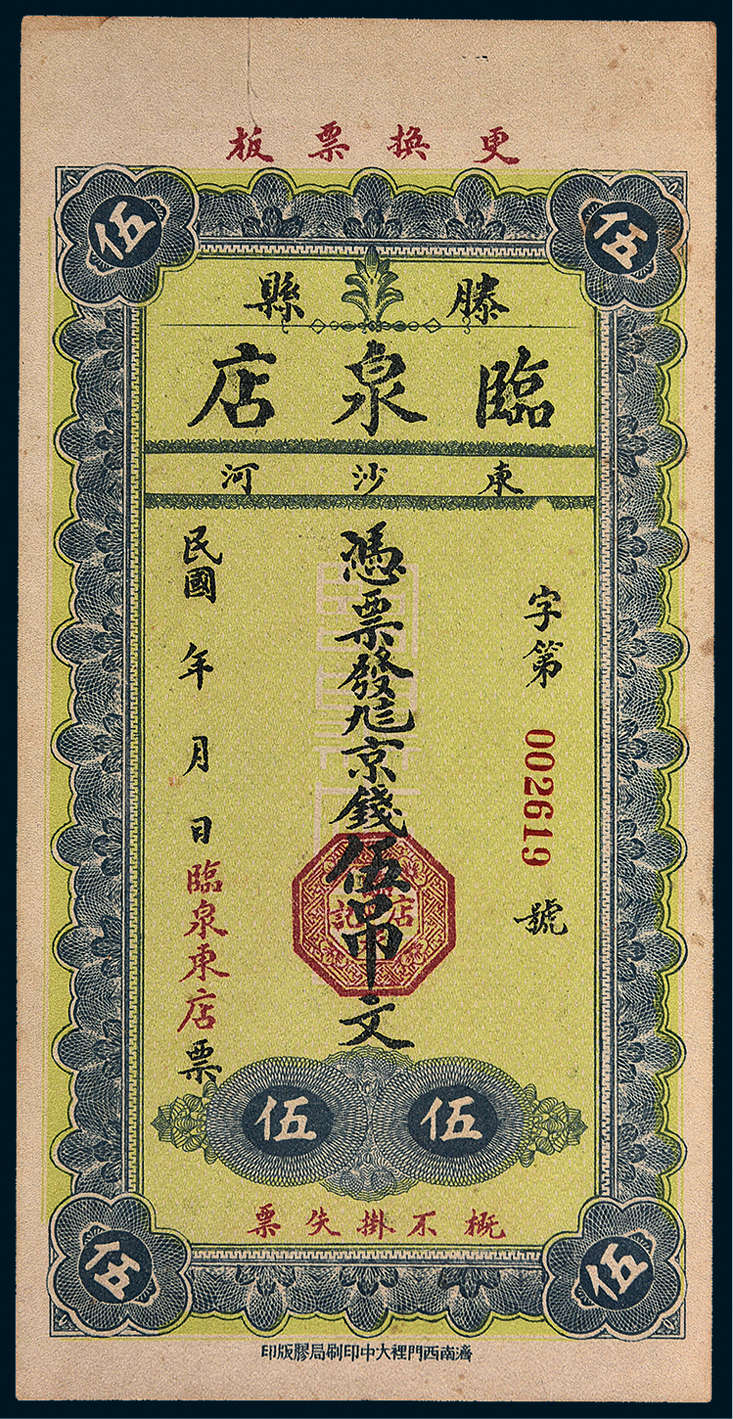
A banknote of 5 diào wén (吊文) Teng Xian Lin Money Shop.

== Sources ==
- Cheng Linsun (2003) Banking in modern China: entrepreneurs, professional managers and the development of Chinese banks. Cambridge University Press, New York, pp 1897–1937.
- Hamashita Takeshi (濱下武志) (1980) Chūgokutsūshōginkō no setsuritsu to Honkon Shanhaiginkō (中国通商銀行の設立と香港上海銀行). Hitotsubashironsō. (in Japanese).
- Huang Da (黃達), Liu Hongru (劉鴻儒), Zhang Xiao (張肖), ed. (1990). Zhongguo jinrong baike quanshu (中國金融百科全書) (Beijing: Jingji guanli chubanshe), Vol. 1, 228. (in Mandarin Chinese).
- Huang Jianhui (黃鑒暉) (1994) Zhongguo yinhangyeshi (中國銀行業史). Shanxi jingji chubanshe, Taiyuan. (in Mandarin Chinese).
- Ji Zhaojin (2002). A History of Modern Shanghai Banking. Armonk: M.E. Sharpe.
- Kang Guohong (康國宏) (1997). "Qianzhuang (錢莊)", in Men Kui (門巋), Zhang Yanjin (張燕瑾) (ed.), Zhonghua guocui da cidian (中華國粹大辭典) (Hong Kong: Guoji wenhua chuban gongsi), 102. (in Mandarin Chinese).
- Kwan Man Bun (2001) The salt merchants of Tianjin: state-making and civil society in late Imperial China. University of Hawaii Press, Honolulu, Hawai.
- McElderry, A.L. (1976). Shanghai old-style banks (Ch'ien- Chuang), 1800–1925: a traditional institution in a changing society. Ann Arbor, Michigan: Center for Chinese Studies, University of Michigan.
- McLean D (1976) Finance and ‘informal empire’ before the first world war. Economic History Revue.
- Pan Liangui (潘連貴) (2004) Shanghai huobishi (上海貨幣史). Shanghai renminchubanshe, Shanghai. (in Mandarin Chinese).
- Peng, Xinwei (1988) [1954]. Zhongguo huobi shi 中国货币史 [A Monetary History of China]. Shanghai: Shanghai renmin chubanshe. The book has been translated into English by Edward 11. Kaplan as A Monetary History of China (Bellingham, WA: Western Washington, 1994).
- Peng Xinwei (彭信威) (1994) A monetary history of China (translated by Edward H. Kaplan). Western Washington University (Bellingham, Washington).
- Wagel, S. S. (1915). Chinese Currency and Banking. Shanghai: North China Daily News and Herald.
- Wang, Y. F. (2017). The Risk Control of Qianzhuang. International Business and Management, 14 (2), 38-47.
- Wu Chengxi (吴承禧). Zhongguo de Yinhang (中國的銀行). Shanghai: Shangwu yinshuguan, 1934. (in Mandarin Chinese).
- Yao Enquan (姚恩權) (1993). "Qianzhuang (錢莊)", in Shi Quanchang (石泉長), ed. Zhonghua baike yaolan (中華百科要覽) (Shenyang: Liaoning renmin chubanshe), 86. (in Mandarin Chinese).
- Ye Shichang (葉世昌) (2003) Gudai Zhongguo jingji sixiangshi (古代中國經濟思想史). Fudan daxue chubanshe, Shanghai. (in Mandarin Chinese).
- Zhang Guohui (張國輝) (1992). "Qianzhuang (錢莊)", in Zhongguo da baike quanshu (中國大百科全書), Zhongguo lishi (中國歷史) (Beijing / Shanghai: Zhongguo da baike quanshu chubanshe), Vol. 2, 775. (in Mandarin Chinese).
- Zhang Guohui - Wan Qing qian zhuang he piao hao yan jiu (in Mandarin Chinese).
- Zhang Guohui (張國輝) (1988). "Qianzhuang (錢莊)", in Zhongguo da baike quanshu (中國大百科全書), Jingjixue (經濟學), Vol. 2, 729. (in Mandarin Chinese).
- Zhao Yulin (趙玉林), Wang Huazhong (王化中), ed. (1990). Jingjixue cidian (經濟學辭典) (Beijing: Zhongguo jingji chubanshe), 702. (in Mandarin Chinese).
