= Peng Xinwei =

Chinese economic historian

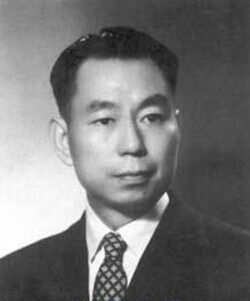
Peng Xinwei

Peng Xinwei 彭信威 (P'eng Hsin-wei) (1907–1967) was a Chinese economic historian, and author of A Monetary History of China.

== Life ==
Peng was born in Yantian, Xixiang, Jiangxi province, in 1907. After studying in Japan, he became a banker in Shanghai. His approach to economic history was influenced by the work of Carl Menger and Ludwig von Mises. Peng also taught at Fudan University in Shanghai. He died in 1967.

== A Monetary History of China ==
This pioneering work is acclaimed internationally.

"It is a classic in the field of Chinese monetary history and numismatics" – Hans Ulrich Vogel, University of Tuebingen.

"His monumental two-volume work, A Monetary History of China, is much more than a history of money. It is a comprehensive history of Chinese economic thought." – William N. Goetzmann

- 1954 "中国货币史" Zhongguo huobi shi (Qunlian publishing house 群联出版社)
- 1958 "中国货币史" Zhongguo huobi shi (Shanghai Renmin publishing house 上海人民出版社)
- 1965 "中国货币史" Zhongguo huobi shi (Shanghai Renmin publishing house 上海人民出版社)
- 1994 A Monetary History of China (English translation by Edward H. Kaplan)
