= List of coin hoards in Vietnam =

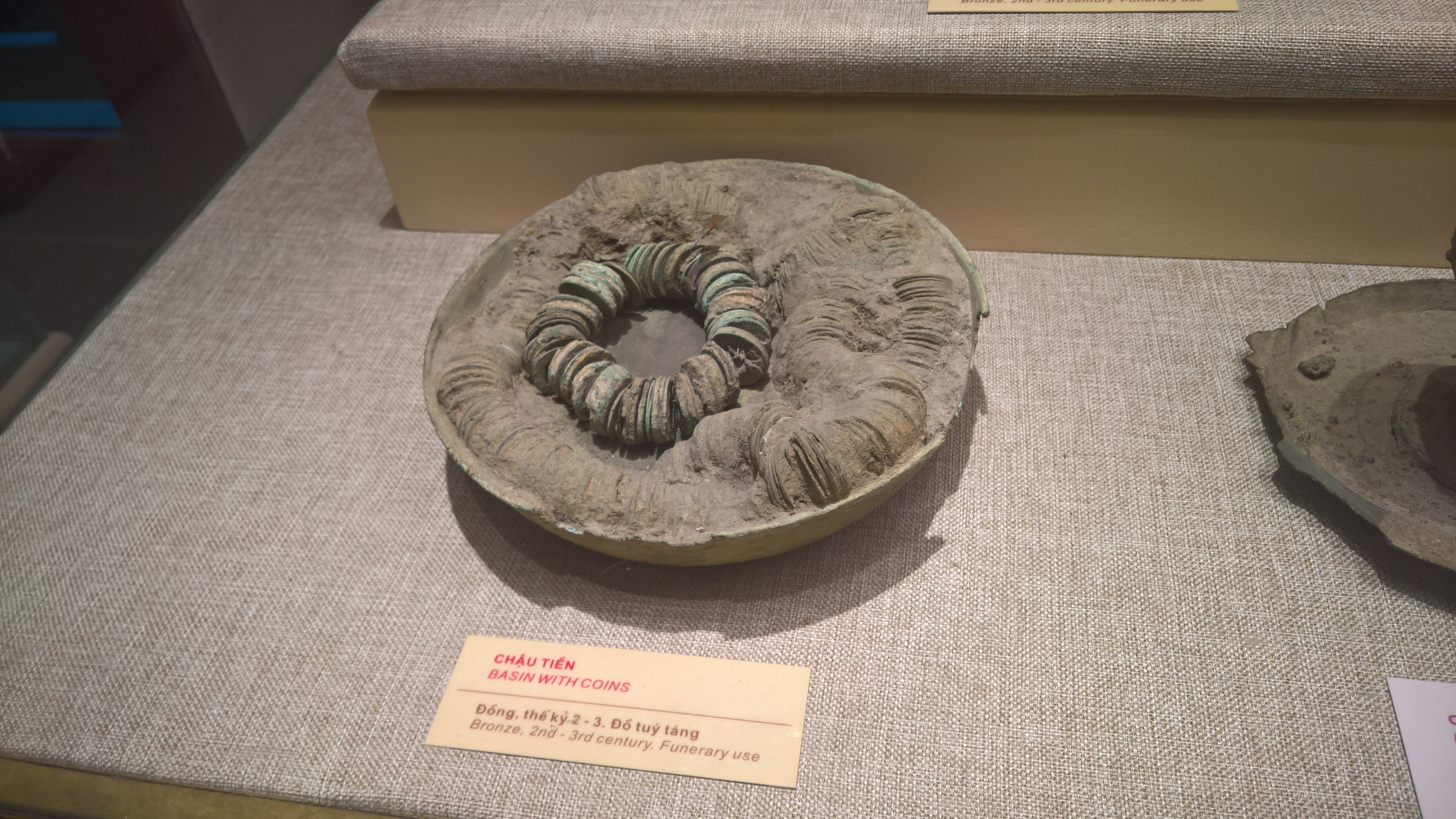
A lump of ancient Vietnamese cash coins in the National Museum of Vietnamese History, Hanoi.

The list of coin hoards in Vietnam comprises significant archaeological hoards of coins, other types of coinages (e.g. sycees) or objects related to coins discovered in Vietnam. The history of Vietnamese currency, independent from China, dates back to the Đinh dynasty period with the Thái Bình Hưng Bảo (太平興寶), produced from 970 to 979. The Vietnamese produced cash coins similar to the ones produced in China and circulated alongside Chinese, Japanese, Korean, and Ryukyuan cash coins brought into the country through international trade. Cash coins continued to be produced in Vietnam until the 1940s under the Nguyễn dynasty. Through international trade foreign currencies such as Spanish dollars and Mexican reals were brought into the country by merchants and these coins would continue to circulate in Vietnam until the French colonial administration outlawed their usage on January 1, 1906, in favour of their own coinage, while Vietnamese cash coins were permitted to continue circulating. Despite the presence of coinages barter persisted until the 20th century. Following its declaration of independence in 1945 the Democratic Republic of Vietnam started issuing its own currency in 1946, while allowing cash coins to circulate until 1948. In 1952 the piastre was abolished and replaced with the South Vietnamese đồng in the south in 1953. Following Vietnamese reunification in 1976 the North Vietnamese đồng and Liberation đồng would continue to circulate in the Socialist Republic of Vietnam until May 2, 1978, when they were replaced by a new national currency.

The coins uncovered in Vietnam includes both native coinages as well as Chinese cash coins in large numbers as Vietnam was a part of China as well as through historical trade with China.

Vietnamese cash coins are also sometimes found in other countries because of trade, such as a Trần dynasty cash coin being unearthed in Hakodate, Japan.

== Overview ==
In modern Vietnam the supply of undiscovered cash coins is rapidly declining as large amounts of Vietnamese cash coins were excavated during the 1980s and 1990s, in Vietnam the excavation of antiques such as cash coins is an industry in itself and the cash coins are mostly being dug up by farmers. After the Vietnam War ended in 1975 a large number of metal detectors numbering in the many thousands were left behind in the former area of South Vietnam which helped fuel the rise of this industry. The antique bronze industry is mostly concentrated in small rural villages where farmers rent metal detectors to search their own lands for bronze antiques to then either sell as scrap or to dealers, these buyers purchase lumps of cash coins by either kilogramme or ton to then hire skilled people to search through these lumps of cash coins for sellable specimens, these coins are then sold to other dealers in Vietnam, China, and Japan. During the zenith of the coin recovery business in Vietnam the number of bulk coins found on a monthly basis was fifteen tons but only roughly fifteen kilogrammes of those coins were sellable and the rest of the coins would melted down as scrap metal. As better metal detectors that could search deeper more Vietnamese cash coins were discovered but in modern times the supply of previously undiscovered Vietnamese cash coins is quickly diminishing.

In modern times many Vietnamese cash coins are found in sunken shipwrecks which are mandated by Vietnamese law to be the property of the Vietnamese government as salvaged ships of which the owner was unknown belong to the state.

== List of coin hoards in Vietnam ==
List of coin hoards in Vietnam
Date of discovery	Place of discovery	Image	Content	Long description of the find and notes	Date (if known)	Current location (if known)
1942	Óc Eo, Thoại Sơn District, An Giang Province, French Cochinchina		Roman coins from the 2nd century.	French archaeologist Louis Malleret is credited with having unearthed Roman imperial coinage at the Óc Eo archaeological in 1942. The attribution of this find is dubious as some sources claim that Malleret had purchased them from the locals of the area rather than excavating the coins by himself.		
1994	Thái Nguyên		A jar filled with cash coins.	In the year 1994 a jar was discovered in Thái Nguyên which contained cash coins produced during 12th–16th centuries.		The State Bank of Vietnam, Hanoi
January 2007	Perfume River, Huế, Thừa Thiên-Huế Province		Various types of cash coins.	A large number of antique cash coins had been found in the rivers that are located near the former capital city of Huế. The cash coins that have been found at these rivers include Tây Sơn dynasty Quang Trung Thông Bảo (光中通寶) and Cảnh Thịnh Thông Bảo (景盛通寶) cash coins, Nguyễn dynasty Gia Long Thông Bảo (嘉隆通寶) and Minh Mạng Thông Bảo (明命通寶) cash coins made of copper and zinc, as well as presentation coins made from gold or silver. The discovery of many cash coins over the years has been used as evidence that the Thừa Thiên-Huế region was a central hub for trade.		
July 5, 2007	Lệ Thủy District, Quảng Bình Province		20 kilograms of Chinese Tang dynasty cash coins.	A scrap metal collector named Nguyen Duc Dung found a hoard of Tang dynasty cash coins, while digging in a rice field on July 5, 2007. Tran Anh Tuan, an artefact expert and the director of the Quảng Bình Provincial Museum, noted that Kaiyuan Tongbao (開元通寶) cash coins circulated in Vietnam during this period as Vietnam was a part of China at the time. Nguyen Duc Dung was able to sell the cash coins for ₫ 200,000 (US$ 12.50) per kilogram, which had a total value ₫ 4,000,00 (US$250).		
July 11, 2007	Hàm Ninh commune, Quảng Ninh District, Quảng Bình Province		Chinese Tang dynasty cash coins.	On July 11, 2007, three refuse collectors had unearthed five jars, which contained 30 kilograms of Tang dynasty period Kaiyuan Tongbao (開元通寶) cash coins in the Hàm Ninh commune, Quảng Ninh District, Quảng Bình Province.		
September 2007	Hải Quy commune, Hải Lăng District, Quảng Trị province		100 kilogrammes of Chinese cash coins.	According to Le Duc Tho, the deputy director of the Quảng Trị Museum noted that a jar containing cash coins weighing approximately 100 kilograms was unearthed by local farmers while they were working in Hải Quy commune, Hải Lăng District, Quảng Trị province. All the artifacts from the hoard are intact except for the upper part of the jar, which was broken upon discovery. The Chinese cash coins found inside of the jar dated from the 16th century to the 18th century. Le Duc Tho noted that in the past few years a lot of Chinese and Vietnamese cash coins had been unearthed in the Quảng Trị province, particularly in the Gio Ling and Triệu Phong Districts, but this hoard was the first time this type of jar had been found (nearly) intact.		The Quảng Trị Museum
November 2007	Hà Tây village, Quảng Trị province		35 kilogrammes of Vietnamese cash coins.	It was reported by the local newspaper Saigon Liberation that 35 kilogrammes of Vietnamese cash coins were unearthed in the province of Quảng Trị in the year 2007. The discovered cash coins dated from the 9th century until the 15th century. The cash coins were unearthed by a local villager, who was scavenging for rubble iron and steel left from the Vietnam War, in Hà Tây village. Later a man named Nguyen Du Dac purchased the coins and donated them to the Quảng Trị museum. The cash coins unearthed were contained inside of a glazed terracotta jar and most of them tend to come from several of Chinese dynasties. Furthermore, the terracotta jar also contained a number of rare Vietnamese cash coins that were cast between the years 960 and 1454.	15th century	The Quảng Trị Museum
2008	Kiến Thụy District, Haiphong		52.9 kilogrammes of Chinese and Vietnamese cash coins.	52.9 kilogrammes of Chinese and Vietnamese cash coins being unearthed in a cemetery in Haiphong in 2008. The cash coins were discovered by workers and located inside of two glazed terra-cotta jars at the archeological site of Go Gao, an area which housed a food warehouse during the feudal period. The discovered cash coins circulated from the 14th century to the 15th century. Most of the cash coins were issued by the Chinese Hongwu Emperor and the Vietnamese monarch Lê Nhân Tông, according to an appraisal from the Hải Phòng Museum.	15th century	The Hải Phòng Museum
2008	Đức Hương commune, Vũ Quang District, Hà Tĩnh Province		90 kilograms of Chinese and Vietnamese cash coins.	A villager, while searching for scrap materials, discovered a large ceramic jar which contained 90 kg of antique cash coins. Most of the cash coins had a diameter of 22–27 millimeters and a square hole of between 0,5 and 0,7 millimeters and were typically made of bronze, although very rusty. According to initial conjecture, there were 8 different inscriptions of Vietnamese cash coins in the pot and 3 different inscriptions of Chinese cash coins, in which the Vietnamese inscription Quang Trung Thông Bảo (光中通寶, 1788–1793) was found to be the largest quantity. Other Vietnamese cash coins from the hoard have the inscriptions Cảnh Hưng (1740–1786), Cảnh Thống (1498–1504), and Chiêu Thống (1787–1788). Chinese cash coins were found with the inscriptions Hoàng Tống (1141–1149), Khang Hy Thông Bảo (1662–1723), and Càn Long Thông Bảo (1736–1796).	Late 18th century	The Hà Tĩnh Museum
September 2010	The tomb of Thoại Ngọc Hầu, Châu Đốc		A Thái Đức Thông Bảo (泰德通寶) cash coin.	A Tây Sơn dynasty cash coin issued under Nguyễn Nhạc was found inside of the tomb of Thoại Ngọc Hầu and his two wives. This discovery is considered significant because Thoại Ngọc Hầu was a high-ranking Nguyễn dynasty official and as Tây Sơn dynasty coinage was banned from circulating by the Nguyễn government.	1829	
Saturday September 4, 2010	Quốc Tuấn commune, An Lão District, Haiphong		24 kilograms of cash coins including Cảnh Hưng coinage (景興錢), Gia Long Thông Bảo (嘉隆通寶) cash coins, Khang Hi Thông Bảo (康熙通寶) and Càn Long Thông Bảo (乾隆通寶) cash coins.	On Saturday September 4, 2010, while working on his pond Nguyen Van Bay found a terracotta jar with sophisticated patterns in Haiphong. The jar contained 24 kilograms of Chinese and Vietnamese cash coins issued by various dynasties. As the cash coins were buried in mud for a long time many of them were corroded together. Trung, the vice-director of the Haiphong City Museum stated that Bay's family was rewarded by the museum for handing over their to the museum. Trung further noted that while the Haiphong City Museum owns a vast collection of ancient coins, it has no archaeologists in its staff and that the fate of the coins was likely that they would collect dust like all the others in their collection.	19th century	The Hải Phòng Museum
2012	Quảng Thuận commune, Quảng Trạch District, Quảng Bình Province (Note: Present-day Quảng Thuận commune, Ba Đồn, Quảng Bình Province.)		10.5 kilogrammes of the antique bronze cash coins.	A jar filled with bronze cash coins was uncovered by a local resident when he was digging a well for his house in Quảng Trạch District, Quảng Bình Province. The cash coins were produced by the Chinese Northern Song dynasty and date back to the 10th to 13th centuries. The coins generally are 23 centimetres in diameter.		The Quảng Bình Museum
July or August 2013	A shipwreck in the coastal waters of Quảng Nam Province		10 copper cash coins	A small number of copper coins were discovered inside of a shipwreck by a 39-year-old diver named Dinh Tan Tau alongside a large number of ceramic boxes used to contain cosmetic powders.		
November 27, 2013	Village 1, Xuân Lập commune, Thọ Xuân District, Thanh Hóa Province		4 kilograms of Nguyễn dynasty cash coins.	While Mrs. Đỗ Thị Lòng and her family were digging a foundation to build a house they a ceramic jar around 1 meter under the ground containing nearly 4 kilograms of ancient cash coins dated the Nguyễn dynasty (1802–1945), as reported by the People's Committee Xuân Lập commune. The cash coins were very rusty with most having unreadable inscriptions. Among the hoard were 0,75 kilograms of Gia Long Thông Bảo with a diameter of 2 centimeters; 2,3 kilograms of Minh Mệnh Thông Bảo (or Minh Mạng Thông Bảo) cash coins with a diameter of 1,92 centimeters; 1,25 kilograms of Triệu Trị Thông Bảo cash coins with diameters ranging between 2,2 and 2,5 centimeters, and 1,05 kilograms of Tự Đức Thông Bảo cash coins with diameters ranging between 2 and 2,5 centimeters. The rest of the cash coins had the inscriptions Đồng Khánh Thông Bảo and Thành Thái Thông Bảo.	Nguyễn dynasty period	
11:30 29 December 2013	Yên Vinh village, Hưng Đông commune, Vinh City, Nghệ An Province		10 kilograms of cash coins.	According to a report by the Tuổi Trẻ newspaper, a 36-year-old man named Nguyễn Quang Tùng had discovered a clay jar located 1.2 meters under the ground while he was gardening. The clay jar contained 10 kilograms of cash coins, the coins tend to be 2.4 centimeters in diameter. According to Dao Tam Tinh, director of the Nghệ An Library and an antique researcher, noted that most of the cash coins were produced by the Chinese Song dynasty between the years 960 and 1279. According to Nguyen Quang Tung the area where he lived belonged to rich landlords in feudal Vietnam and might have been buried there to hide them. Nguyen Quang Tung further noted that his discovery had attracted a lot of curiosity and that a number of antique collectors had offered ₫10,000,000 (US$476).		
October 4, 2014	Hà Tĩnh Province		22 kg of Vietnamese and Chinese ancient metal cash coins and a revival Lê dynasty period pottery bowl wearing Chinese characters.	On October 4, 2014, a man named Dang Van Sinh noticed a number of strangers digging in his garden at night, suspecting them of being thieves he alerted them to his presence which caused the thieves to run the scene leaving behind the cash coins. The coins were originally located inside of five different terra-cotta jars which had been buried underground, and of which a single one was broken. The next Thursday, Dang Van Sinh had called the Hà Tĩnh Museum, who reportedly sent a number of experts to the site to collect the cash coins. Le Ba Hanh, the vice director of the Hà Tĩnh Museum, noted that the recovered cash coins mostly dated to the Revival Lê dynasty period and were mostly produced between the years 1740 and 1786, while the numismatic hoard also included a number Chinese Song dynasty period cash coins that dated to 1085. The Vietnamese cash coins from the hoard are bigger and heavier than the Chinese specimens.		The Hà Tĩnh Museum
May 22, 2015	Lảnh Trì village, Mộc Nam commune, Duy Tiên District, Hà Nam Province		50 kilograms of cash coins.	While digging the foundation for a water tank a 39-year-old villager, named Lương Mạnh Hải, found 50 kilograms of cash coins in the province of Hà Nam inside of a terracotta jar on May 22, 2015. Most of the cash coins are 2.4 centimeters in diameter and 0.1 centimeter thick.		
November 8, 2015	Cam Thủy, Lệ Thủy District, Quảng Bình Province		Two Nguyễn dynasty period presentation coins.	The presentation coins were discovered by a man named Ngo Thanh Anh while he was gardening on his own premises in the Cam Thủy commune, Lệ Thủy District, Quảng Bình Province. Presentation coins were gifted to people by the Emperor of the Nguyễn dynasty to those who had made great contributions to the imperial court, and unlike actual cash coins could not be used to purchase goods and services. Both presentation coins are 12 centimetres in diameter, have a thickness of 0.5 centimetres, and all have a square centre hole. One of the presentation coins was issued under Gia Long and the other under Minh Mạng. One of the presentation coins depicts a dragon chasing the sun, while the other featured an image of the Meridian Gate in the Imperial City of Huế and the inscription "Đại Nam's precious national object" written in Chinese characters.	Nguyễn dynasty period	The Provincial Museum of Quảng Bình
January 2016	Bình Hà, Kỳ Tây commune, Kỳ Anh District, Hà Tĩnh Province		15 kilograms of ancient cash coins dated to the Northern Song dynasty period.	While growing grass at the cow farm Mr. Nguyễn Tuấn Lịch, who lives in Sơn Bình 2 village, Kỳ Sơn commune, Kỳ Anh District, Hà Tĩnh Province, and 2 of his friends discovered a large amount of ancient cash coins. Nguyễn Tuấn Lịch found 3 large ceramic jars located about 15 centimeters in the ground, these ceramic jars contained around 15 kilograms of cash coins. While initially the cash coins were all dirty and heavily affected by the elements, after cleaning them with gasoline they were found to be largely intact and of good quality. The cash coins are all from the Northern Song dynasty. Most coins are about 2,4 centimeters in diameter and have a thickness of 0,1 centimeter.	Likely the 13th century	
2018	Cẩm Xuyên and Kỳ Anh Districts, Hà Tĩnh Province		A small number of Nagasaki trade coins.	A number of Nagasaki trade coins in the province of Hà Tĩnh in 2018. The cash coins have a diameter of about 24 millimeters and each coin had a 7 millimeter square centre hole. This find is notably this is the first time that ancient Japanese cash coins have been found in Hà Tĩnh Province.		The Hà Tĩnh Museum
July 2019	Yên Bái Province		100 kg of cash coins.	It was reported by the Vietnam News Agency on July 28, 2019, local police had arrested a motorcyclist during a traffic stop who had 100 kilograms (200 pounds). The cash coins were recently unearthed in the Yên Bái Province and were purchased by the motor cyclist. The numismatic hoard included cash coins issued under Emperor Wu of Han in 118 B.C., as well as cash coins produced from the 7th century until the 13th century A.D.		
November–December 2019	Đức Lĩnh village, Vũ Quang District, Hà Tĩnh Province		100 kilograms of ancient cash coins (錢樞古, tiền xu cổ) with 25–27 different inscriptions, mostly from the Tây Sơn dynasty.	In the month November 2019 a farmer named Nguyễn Văn Phù, after hiring an excavation machine, discovered a porcelain jar containing around 30 kilograms of cash coins, suspecting that there might be more ancient coins in the ground Nguyễn Văn Phù hired a metal detector and discovered two more porcelain pots. Later some more coins were discovered by Nguyễn Văn Phù together with Đậu Khoa Toàn, the director of the Hà Tĩnh Museum. According to Đậu Khoa Toàn the Hà Tĩnh Museum paid Mr. Nguyễn Văn Phù for 10 kilograms of the coins in accordance Vietnamese "Cultural heritage law" (Luật Di sản), which states that people should be financially reimbursed if they discover items of importance to Vietnamese cultural heritage. Mr. Đậu Khoa Toàn said that the museum only needs such a small sample for research and preservation. According to Mr. Đậu Khoa Toàn these cash coins were likely hidden there by the Cần Vương movement against French rule under Phan Đình Phùng to pay for the salaries of insurgent soldiers, as he claims that at the time there were no landlords wealthy enough to have been in possession of so much money.	Cần Vương Rebellion (1885–1896)	10 kg of them in the hands of the Hà Tĩnh Museum
July 2021	Tuan Quan relic site in northern Yên Bái Province		A small number of Nguyễn dynasty period cash coins.	The coins were found during the excavations at the Tuan Quan relic site. The Tuan Quan No.1 relic site was first surveyed in the year 2018 and excavated for the first time in the year 2019, while the Tuan Quan No. 2 site has been explored much earlier since 2002.	Nguyễn dynasty period	

== See also ==
- List of coin hoards in China

== Sources ==
- Barker, Allan (2004). The Historical Cash Coins of Viet Nam. ISBN 981-05-2300-9.
