= Vietnamese cash =

Cast round coin with square hole, currency of Vietnam from 970 to 1948

Chữ Hán: 文 (Văn) Chữ Nôm: 銅 (Đồng) French: Sapèque
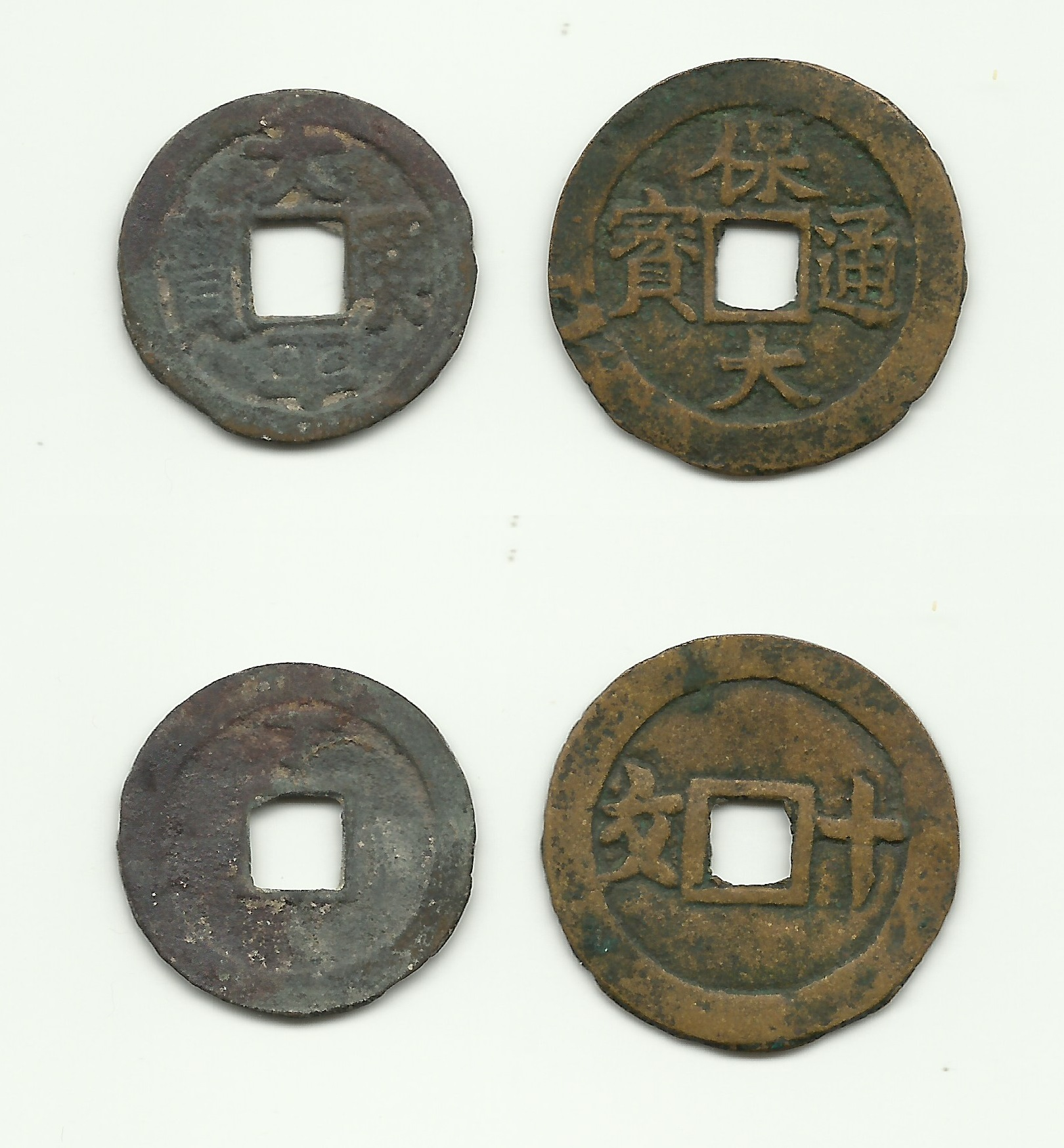
- First and last Vietnamese cash coins: Thái Bình Hưng Bảo (太平興寶) issued during the Đinh dynasty (970–980). Bảo Đại Thông Bảo (保大通寶) issued under Bảo Đại (1925–1945).

Units of account
- Superunit
- 10: Phân (分)
- 36–60: Mạch (陌) / Tiền (錢)
- 360–600: Quán (貫) / Nguyên (元)
- 20: Đồng (銅); In the Democratic Republic of Vietnam between 1947 and 1948, making them equal to 5 xu (樞).

Demographics
- Date of introduction: 970
- User(s): Vietnam; French Indochina (until 1945); North Vietnam (until 1948)
- This infobox shows the latest status before this currency was rendered obsolete.

The Vietnamese cash (chữ Hán: 文錢 văn tiền; chữ Nôm: 銅錢 đồng tiền; French: sapèque), (Note: The term văn (文) was first used in Vietnam in 1861 and the coins were referred to as đồng tiền (銅錢, copper coins) or simply as coins. Denominations of the Vietnamese cash coins were based on their weight and metal alloys and their value was determined by these aspects and their individual quality. In English these types of coins are referred to as "cash coins".) (Note: These coins may alternatively be referred to as sous in French, which is also the French nickname name for the French 1 centime coin making it an equivalent to the English term "Penny".) also called the sapek or sapèque, (Note: Note that the term sapèque is the French word for "cash coins" and also refers to cash coins from China, Japan, Korea, and the Ryūkyū islands. Some English language sources use the term "sapèque" to refer to machine-struck cash coins, while they use the term "cash coins" for those which were manufactured using traditional casting methods.) is a cast round coin with a square hole that was an official currency of Vietnam from the Đinh dynasty in 970 until the Nguyễn dynasty in 1945, and remained in circulation in North Vietnam until 1948. The same type of currency circulated in China, Japan, Korea, and Ryūkyū for centuries. Though the majority of Vietnamese cash coins throughout history were copper coins, lead, iron (from 1528) and zinc (from 1740) coins also circulated alongside them often at fluctuating rates (with 1 copper cash being worth 10 zinc cash in 1882). Coins made from metals of lower intrinsic value were introduced because of various superstitions involving Vietnamese people burying cash coins, as the problem of people burying cash coins became too much for the government. Almost all coins issued by government mints tended to be buried mere months after they had entered circulation. The Vietnamese government began issuing coins made from an alloy of zinc, lead, and tin. As these cash coins tended to be very fragile, they would decompose faster if buried, which caused the Vietnamese people to stop burying their coins.

The inscriptions of Vietnamese cash coins can be written in either the Viết chéo (曰湥 / 曰袑, top-bottom-right-left) style or the Viết thuận (曰順, clockwise, top-right-bottom-left) style.

== Etymology ==
=== Sapèque ===
The French term for cash coins, sapèque, comes from the Malay terms sa pek or sa pe meaning 'one pe(k)' (pek, or pie, being a kind of currency), which in turn come from the Chinese word peku/pak (百, Vietnamese reading: bách) meaning 'one-hundred'. The origin of the term might have come from the fact that cash coins were typically strung together in strings of around a hundred pieces.

The French adopted the term sapèque in Macau and initially used it to refer to Chinese cash coins but later also applied the term for Vietnamese cash coins.

=== Slang names ===
In the late 19th century Điêm slang spoken by the lower-class people of Saigon the term tể was used to refer to cash coins; this term was an abbreviation of Tiền (錢).

== Currency units ==
Traditionally, the basic units of Vietnamese currency were quan (貫, quán), tiền, and đồng. One quan was 10 tiền, and one tiền was between 50 and 100 đồng, depending on the time period. From the reign of Emperor Trần Thái Tông onward, 1 tiền was 69 đồng in ordinary commercial transactions but 1 tiền was 70 đồng for official transactions. From the reign of Emperor Lê Lợi, 1 tiền was decreed to be 50 đồng. During the Northern and Southern dynasties of Vietnam period, beginning in 1528, coins were reduced from 24 millimetres (0.94 in) to 23 millimetres (0.91 in) in diameter and diluted with zinc and iron. The smaller coinage was called tiền gián or sử tiền, in contrast to the larger tiền quý (literally, 'valuable cash') or cổ tiền. One quan tiền quý was equivalent to 600 đồng, while 1 quan tiền gián was only 360 đồng. During the Later Lê dynasty, 1 tiền was 60 đồng; therefore, 600 đồng was 1 quan. During the Yuan dynasty, Vietnamese traders at the border with China used the rate 1 tiền to 67 đồng. Zinc coins began to appear in Dai Viet during the 18th century. One copper (đồng) coin was worth 3 zinc (kẽm) coins. Beginning with the reign of Emperor Gia Long, both copper and zinc coins were in use. Originally the two coins had equal value, but eventually a copper coin rose to double the worth of a zinc coin, then triple, then sixfold, until the reign of Emperor Thành Thái, it was worth ten times a zinc coin.

== History ==
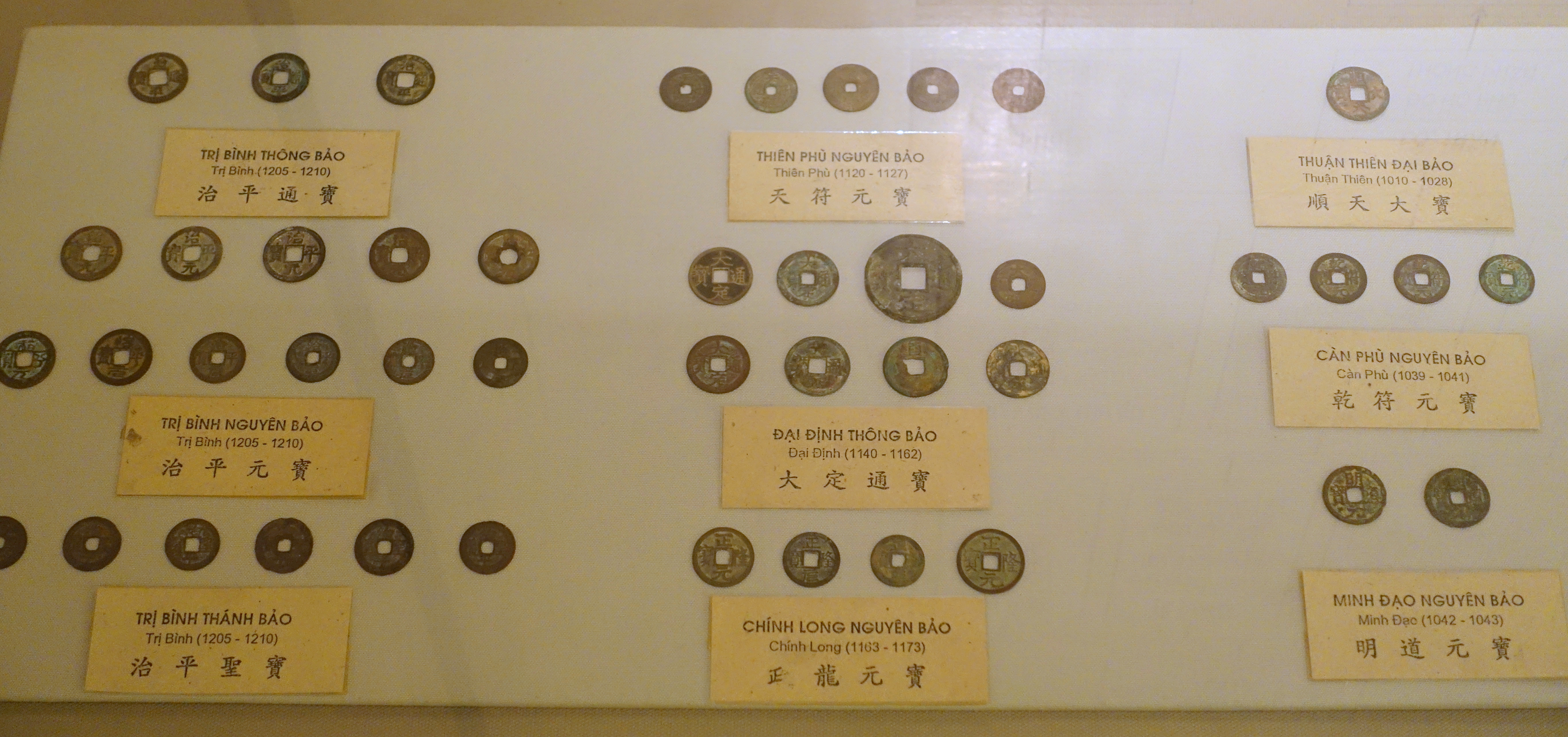
Various Lý dynasty cash coins on display at the National Museum of Vietnamese History, Hanoi.

=== Đinh and Early Lê dynasties ===
During the Bắc thuộc a number of Chinese currencies circulated in Vietnam, during this period precious metals like gold and silver were also used in commercial transactions but it wasn't until Vietnamese independence that the first natively produced cash coins would appear. The cash coins produced in Vietnam typically carried the era name of the period it was produced in.

The first Vietnamese coins were cast under the rule of the Đinh dynasty (968–981) with the introduction of the Thái Bình Hưng Bảo (太平興寶) under Đinh Bộ Lĩnh. Likewise the only inscription cast during the Early Lê dynasty period bore the inscription Thiên Phúc Trấn Bảo (天福鎮寶). However, for the next two centuries coins would remain a rarity in the daily lives of the common people, as bartering would remain the dominant means of exchange under both the Đinh and Early Lê dynasties.

=== Lý dynasty ===
The first cash coins of the Lý dynasty produced during the reign of Emperor Lý Thái Tổ were the Thuận Thiên Đại Bảo (順天大寶), these were among the largest early Vietnamese cash coins with a diameter of 25.5 millimeters. All known variants of this cash coin feature the Chinese character Nguyệt (月) on the top of their reverse sides.

Generally cast coins produced by the Vietnamese from the reign of Lý Thái Tông and onwards were of diminutive quality compared to the Chinese variants. They were often produced with inferior metallic compositions and made to be thinner and lighter than the Chinese wén due to a severe lack of copper that existed during the Lý dynasty. This inspired Chinese traders to recast Chinese coins for export to Vietnam, which caused an abundance of coinage to circulate in the country, prompting the Lý government to suspend the mintage of coins for five decades.

=== Trần dynasty ===
The production of inferior coinage continued under the Trần dynasty. The production of both government and private cash coins happened at a large scale during the Trần period.

It was under the reign of emperor Trần Dụ Tông that the most cash coins were cast of this period; this was because of several calamities such as failed crops that plagued the country during his reign, which caused the Trần government to issue more coins to the populace as compensation. The internal political struggles of the Trần dynasty ensured the cessation of the production of coinage, and as such, no coins were produced during the entire reigns of the last seven monarchs of the Trần dynasty.

After the reign of emperor Trần Nghệ Tông the government of Đại Việt buried large reserves of cash coins in a mountain, the place of storage in this mountain later collapsed which became a contributing factor to cash coins remaining scarce after the Trần dynasty period.

=== Hồ dynasty ===
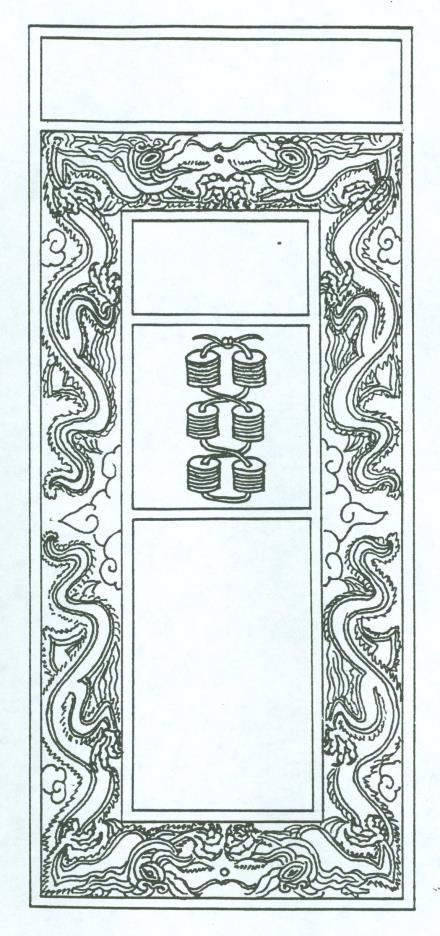
A Đại Trần Thông Bảo Hội Sao (大陳通寶會鈔) banknote of 1 mân (緡).

During the Hồ dynasty the usage of coins was banned by Hồ Quý Ly in 1396 in favour of the Thông Bảo Hội Sao (通寶會鈔) banknote series and ordered people to exchange their coinage for these banknotes (with an exchange rate of one Quân of copper coins for two Thông Bảo Hội Sao banknotes). Those who refused to exchange or continued to pay with coins would be executed and have their possessions taken by the government. Despite these harsh laws, very few people actually preferred paper money and coins remained widespread in circulation, forcing the Hồ dynasty to retract their policies. The Thông Bảo Hội Sao banknotes of the Hồ dynasty featured designs with auspicious clouds (one tiền), turtles (two tiền), Kỳ lân (three tiền), Phượng hoàng (five tiền), and dragons (one quán).

Under the Hồ dynasty cash coins with the inscriptions Thánh Nguyên Thông Bảo (聖元通寶) and Thiệu Nguyên Thông Bảo (紹元通寶) were introduced, but they would only be manufactured in small numbers, though the Later Lê dynasty would produce coins with the same inscriptions less than half a century later in larger quantities.

=== Later Lê, Mạc, and Revival Lê dynasties ===
After Lê Thái Tổ came to power in 1428 by ousting out the Ming dynasty ending the Fourth Chinese domination of Vietnam, the Đại Việt sử ký toàn thư reports that in 1429 it was proposed to reintroduce paper money, but this idea was rejected. Lê Thái Tổ enacted new policies to improve the quality of the manufacturing of coinage leading to the production of coins with both excellent craftsmanship and metal compositions that rivaled that of the best contemporary Chinese coinage. After ascending the throne, Lê Thái Tổ immediately summoned the great officials in the court to discuss the production of money and issued a Chiếu which stated that: "Money is an extremely necessary thing, like the lifeblood of the people, indispensable. Our country minted a few coins, but the copper coins were destroyed a lot by the Ming people, only about one percent remained. Now the domestic consumption is in short supply, in order for the currency to circulate in abundance, to please the people, it is necessary to have a reasonable monetary regulation. So it is impossible not to discuss soon, I will consider implementing." (Note: Quote in Vietnamese: "Tiền là thứ vô cùng cần thiết, như huyết mạch của dân vậy, không thể thiếu được. Nước ta đúc tiền đã ít, mà tiền đồng lại bị người Minh tiêu hủy rất nhiều, chỉ còn chừng một phần trăm thôi. Nay việc tiêu dùng trong nước thiếu thốn, muốn tiền tệ lưu thông dồi dào, thuận lòng dân cần một quy chế tiền tệ hợp lý. Vậy không thể không sớm bàn định tâu lên, Trẫm sẽ cân nhắc thi hành.") After that, the Thuận Thiên Nguyên Bảo (順天元寶) was minted, according to the regulations, 50 đồng is 1 tiền.

The Mạc dynasty, which usurped power between the years 1528 to 1592, also minted its own coinage but they began to use zinc and iron, which were cheaper metals, and they further allowed private coinage to develop which decreased the quality of the coinage. After the Lê dynasty returned to power they tried to combat these monetary practices, but the shortage of copper (as the mines where the copper came from were mostly in areas controlled by China) and the division of the country between the two rival lordships (or principalities) of the Trịnh and Nguyễn lords made these measures ineffective.

Between 1633 and 1637 the Dutch East India Company sold 105,835 strings of 960 cash coins (or 101,600,640 văn) to the Nguyễn lords in Vĩnh Lạc Thông Bảo (永樂通寶), and Khoan Vĩnh Thông Bảo (寬永通寶) coins. This was because the Japanese had restricted trade, forcing the Southern Vietnamese traders to purchase their copper coins from the Dutch Republic rather than from Japanese merchants as before. This trade lead to a surplus of copper in the territory of the Nguyễn lords, allowing them to use the metal (which at the time was scarce in the north) for more practical applications such as nails and door hinges. After this, Nagasaki trade coins, which were specifically minted for the Vietnamese market, also started being traded and circulating in the northern parts of Vietnam where the smaller coins would often be melted down for utensils and only circulated in Hanoi, while larger Nagasaki trade coins circulated all over Vietnam.

From the Dương Hòa era (1635–1643) under Lê Thần Tông until 1675 no coins were cast due to the political turmoil. At the turn of the 18th century Lê Dụ Tông opened a number of copper mines and renewed the production of high quality coinage. During the Vĩnh Thịnh (永盛, 1706–1719) period of Lê Dụ Tông the first large-format cash coins were issued; they had a diameter of 50.5 mm and a weight of 33.13 grams.

According to the Đại Nam thực lục tiền biên from the reign of Túc Tông (lord Nguyễn Phúc Chú) the Nguyễn lords started producing copper cash coins. And later during the reign of the Thế tông Hiếu vũ Hoàng đế (lord Nguyễn Phúc Khoát) the Nguyễn lords started minting white zinc coins, they opened a mint at Lương Quán, where they minted cash coins in the form of the Tường Phù cash coins of the Song dynasty. According to their regulations it was strictly forbidden to mint privately. After minting more money, they produced the Thiên Minh Thông Bảo cash coins.

From 1719 the production of cast copper coins ceased for two decades and taxes were more heavily lifted on the Chinese population as Mandarins could receive a promotion in rank for every 600 strings of cash (or 600,000 coins).

Under Lê Hiển Tông a large variety of Cảnh Hưng (景興) coins were cast with varying descriptions on the obverse. In fact it is thought that more variations of the Cảnh Hưng coin exist than of any other Oriental cash coin in history. There were also new large Cảnh Hưng coins introduced with denominations of 50 and 100 văn and from 1740, various provincial mint marks were added on the reverses of coins. Currently there are around 80 known different kinds of Cảnh Hưng coins. This diversity exists because the Lê government was in dire need of coins to pay for its expenditures, while it needed to collect more taxes in coins, so it began to mint a lot of coins. Later to fulfill this need, the Lê legalised the previously detrimental workshops that were minting inferior coins in 1760 in order to meet the market's high demand for coinage; this backfired as the people found the huge variety in quality and quantity confusing.

In 1775, after capturing Thuận Hóa from the Nguyễn lords, Trịnh Sâm stipulated that 3 zinc cash coins from Nam Hà would be accepted for 1 zinc cash coin from Bắc Hà.

=== Tây Sơn dynasty ===
Under Nguyễn Nhạc the description of Thất Phân (七分) was first added to the reverses of some coins indicating their weight; this continued under the Nguyễn dynasty. Under the reign of Nguyễn Huệ, Quang Trung Thông Bảo (光中通寶) cash coins were produced made in two different types of metal, one series of copper and one series of tin, as well as alloys between the two or copper coins of red copper.

According to the Đại Nam thực lục tiền biên while fighting the Tây Sơn dynasty, the Thế tổ Cao Hoàng đế issued cash coins with the inscription Gia Hưng Thông Bảo (嘉興通寶) in 1796.

=== Nguyễn dynasty ===
During the Nguyễn dynasty period in addition to their circulating zinc, lead, and copper-alloy cash coins the government also produced silver and gold cash coins.

==== Independent Nguyễn dynasty and French Cochinchina ====
Under the Gia Long Emperor three kinds of cash coins were produced in smaller denominations made of copper, lead, and zinc. According to the book Đại Nam thực lục chính biên the first cash coins with the inscription Gia Long Thông Bảo (嘉隆通寶) were cast in the year Gia Long 2 (1803). He officially appointed the Bảo tuyền cục to be in charge of minting cash coins at Tây Long gate outside the city of Huế. In the year Gia Long 12 the Ministry of Revenue was tasked with producing 7 phân zinc cash coins, 1 string of zinc cash coins were ordered to weigh 2 cân 10 lạng on average, and when exchanged into copper-alloy cash coins 125 strings of zinc cash coins were valued at 100 strings of copper-alloy cash coins. Under the Gia Long Emperor mints were opened in Bắc Thành (Hanoi) and Gia Định (Hồ Chí Minh City). In the year Gia Long 13 (1814) another 6 phân zinc cash coin was produced at the Bảo tuyền cục Bắc Thành and ordered them to imitate the minting techniques of the Qing. At that time, the casting ratio included 500 cân of red copper, 415 cân of zinc, 65 cân of lead, and 20 cân of tin.

The cash coins of the Tây Sơn dynasty were initially only allowed to circulate for 5 years after the ascension of Gia Long. According to a document from the year Gia Long 16 (1817) the government of the Nguyễn dynasty ordered for the destruction of all "fake cash coins" from circulation explaining that the prior currency situation was chaotic. The "fake cash coins" were still allowed to circulate in the year Gia Long 15 and must now be destroyed. All payments and salaries for public services and government employees must be expressed in zinc cash coins, government employees must collect all "fake cash coins" they have and store it in a government warehouse to later be melted down and exchanged for the newly minted zinc cash coins. The zinc cash coins were also ordered to circulate in the Southern regions and merchants were ordered to carry them with them whenever they would engage in trade to promote their circulation.

Throughout most of the Nguyễn dynasty period, the government tried to exclude money it termed Tiền cấm (錢禁, "Forbidden money") from circulation. The Tiền cấm included the following three categories:

- 1: Tây Sơn dynasty coinage, because of the Nguyễn dynasty's dislike of the Tây Sơn dynasty, which it viewed as illegitimate, it tried to exclude its coinage from circulation. But because of the extensive issuance of cash coins during this period it wasn't until 1822 that the Nguyễn could successfully discourage their circulation by fixing an exchange rate of 2 Tây Sơn dynasty copper-alloy cash coins for 1 Nguyễn dynasty zinc cash coin.
- 2: Black money, including stolen money.
- 3: Inferior quality money created by Chinese merchants, these cash coins were often of inferior quality and contained a high percentage of lead.

According to the Đại Nam Thực lục chính biên, there were several different types of Gia Long Thông Bảo cash coins cast. A bronze cash coin with the inscription Thất phần (七分) in seal script on its reverse, a thicker zinc cash coin with the inscription Nhất phần on its reverse, and a copper-alloy cash coin with dots on its reverse side symbolising the sun and moon. The 7 phần zinc cash coins started being made from the year Gia Long 12 (1813) onwards.

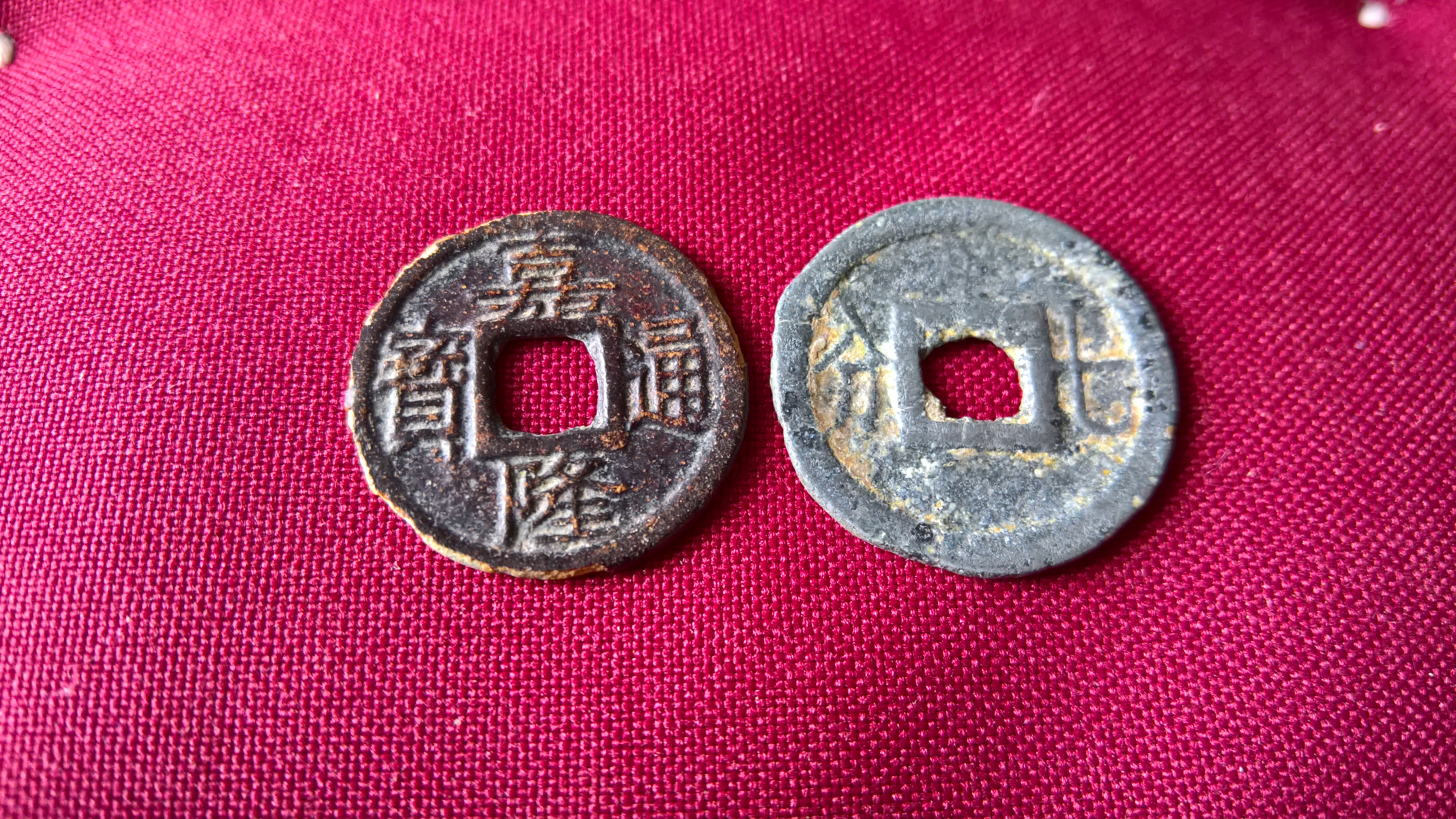
Copper-alloy and zinc cash coins issued under the reign of the Gia Long Emperor.

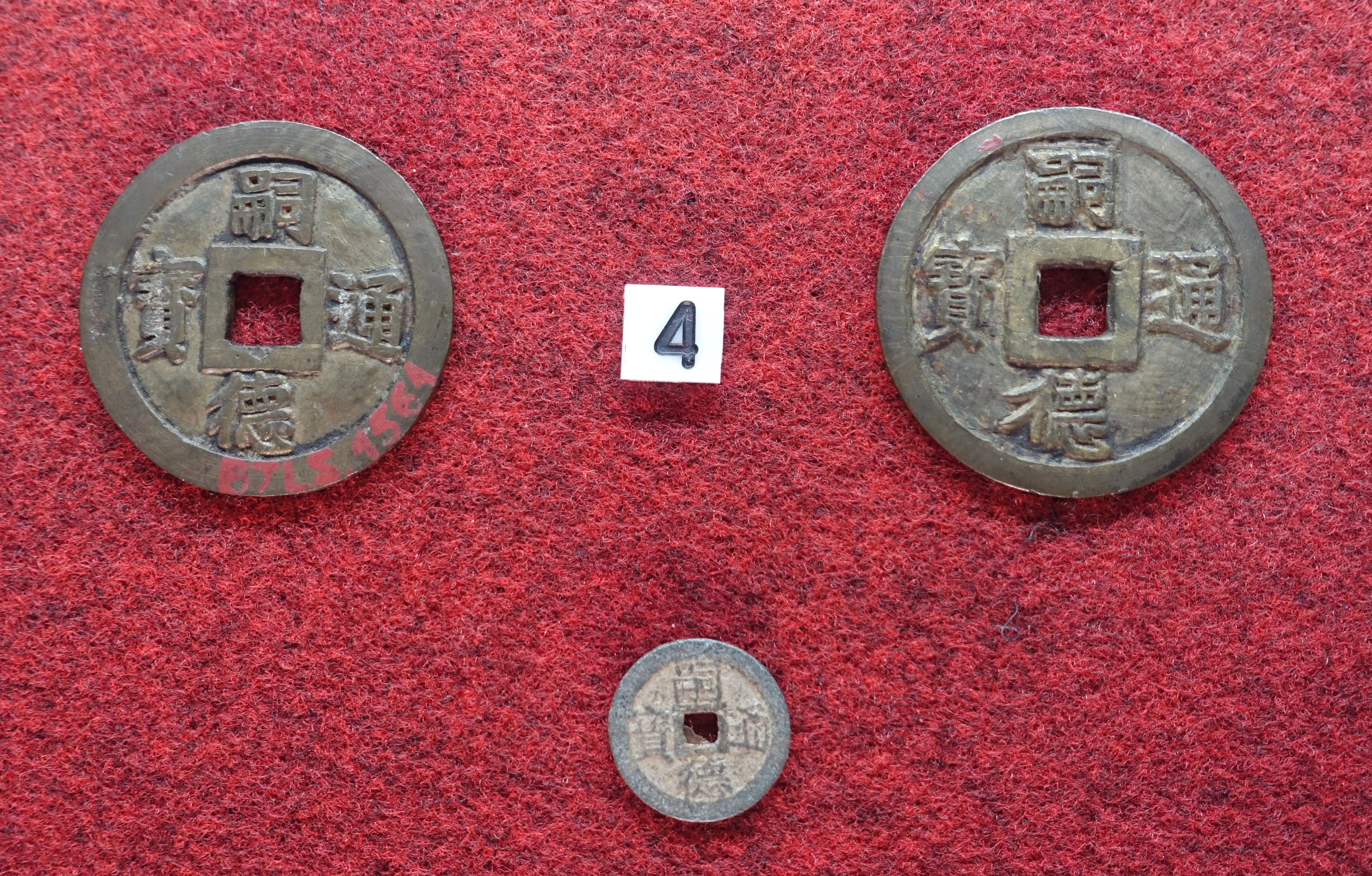
"Tự Đức Thông Bảo" (嗣德通寶) coins of varying denominations, on display at the Museum of Vietnamese History, Ho Chi Minh City.

Since the reign of the Gia Long Emperor, zinc cash coins (銅鐱, Đồng kẽm) had replaced the usage of copper and brass cash coins and formed the basis of the Vietnamese currency system. Under Gia Long the standard 1 văn denomination coins weighed seven phần and under the Minh Mạng Emperor six phần (approximately 2.28 grams) which would remain the standard for future rulers. Zinc cash coins produced in Hanoi under the Tự Đức Emperor had the mint mark Hà Nội (河內) on them, with there being another mint in Sơn Tây (山西).

From the Gia Long until the Thiệu Trị periods 1 copper-alloy cash coin was valued at 1.2 to 1.3 zinc cash coins, from the Tự Đức onwards they were valued at 1.3 to 1.4 zinc cash coins each.

From 1837 during the first year of the reign of the Minh Mạng Emperor, Mạch (陌) brass cash coins were issued; these cash coins feature Minh Mạng Thông Bảo (明命通寶) on their obverses but have eight characters on their reverses. One Mạch coins would be continued under subsequent rulers of the Nguyễn dynasty.

Regarding the circulation of both zinc and copper-alloy cash coins in the country the Minh Mạng Emperor wrote: "Our country mints two types of cash coins, copper cash coins (tiền đồng) and zinc cash coins (tiền kẽm). Zinc cash coins are used for consumption, the rich don't dare to hoard them, but the people in neighbouring countries do not dare to bring them back to their country. It's not only beneficial for the people but also for the country. However, if there are no copper cash coins, who will know the name of our country in the future. Therefore, we should not be left without copper cash coins." (Note: Vietnamese quote: "Nước ta đúc tiền có hai hạng, tiền đồng và tiền kẽm. Tiền kẽm đưa ra tiêu dùng, các nhà giàu không dám tích trữ mà người nước láng giềng đi lại buôn bán cũng không dám mang về nước họ, như vậy chẳng những lợi cho dân mà còn lợi cho nước nữa. Tuy nhiên nếu không có tiền đồng, thời sau này ai mà biết được đại hiệu của nước ta. Vậy tiền đồng cũng không nên để thiếu.")

In 1849 the Tự Đức Emperor was forced to legalise the private production of zinc cash coins as too many illegal mints kept being established throughout both Đại Nam and China. These privately minted zinc cash coins were allowed as long as they circulated according to their correct weights.

However, in 1871 the production of zinc cash coins stopped as many mines were being blocked by Chinese pirates and the continued production of these coins would be too expensive. Other reasons for the discontinuation of zinc cash coins despite them being indispensable to the general populace were because they were heavy compared to their nominal value and the metal was quite brittle. Following the establishment of the French colony of Cochinchina the chaotic monetary situation of Đại Nam severely worsened as Qing Chinese merchants quickly took advantage of it and started producing poor quality cash coins to bring to the colony where no regulations against their activities existed. The Tự Đức Emperor tried to search Qing merchant ships, make outposts block their entry, and ban Qing Chinese merchants from bringing in too much money. Though by 1879 the Nguyễn court was forced to accept the copper-alloy Hành dị dạng tiền (deformed money) at a value of 3 zinc cash coins, provided that the cash coin in question was quite similar in quality to the indigenous Vietnamese currency.

To the French, zinc coinage also presented a huge inconvenience since the colonisation of Cochinchina in 1859 as the exchange between French francs and zinc văn meant that a large number of zinc coins were exchanged for the French franc. Zinc cash coins often broke during transportation as the strings that kept them together would often snap. The coins would fall on the ground and a great number of them would break into pieces; these coins were also less resistant to oxidation, causing them to corrode faster than other coinages.

"Another serious disadvantage consisted in the total absence of token coinages other than the inconvenient sapèque one of zinc: one needed an artillery van to go exchange 1,000 francs in ligatures for the one sapèques, since it had the weight of a barrel and half.... and at the market, the chicken weighed some times less than its price in currency."

— J. Silvestre, Monnaies et de Médailles de l'Annam et de la Cochinchine Française (1883).

Prior to 1849 brass coins had become an extreme rarity and only circulated in the provinces surrounding the capital cities of Vietnam, but under Tự Đức new regulations and (uniform) standards for copper cash coins were created to help promote their usage. Between 1868 and 1872 brass coins were only around 50% copper, and 50% zinc. Due to the natural scarcity of copper in Vietnam the country always lacked the resources to produce sufficient copper coinage for circulation.

Under Tự Đức large coins with the denomination of 60 văn were introduced. These coins were ordered to circulate at a value of 1 tiền, but their intrinsic value was significantly lower so they were badly received; the production of these coins was quickly discontinued in favour of 20, 30, 40, and 50 văn coins known as Đồng Sao. In 1870 Tự Đức Bảo Sao cash coins of 2, 3, 8, and 9 Mạch were issued. Large denomination coins were mostly used for tax collection as their relatively low intrinsic value lowered their spending power on the market.

In 1882, at the time when Eduardo Toda y Güell's Annam and its minor currency was published, only two government mints remained in operation: one in Hanoi, and one in Huế. However, private mints were allowed to cast cash coins with the permission of the government, and a large number of cash coins were also imported from abroad as at that time the Portuguese colony of Macau had six mints with twelve furnaces producing 600,000 cash coins for Vietnam on a daily basis.

Cash coins circulated in the 19th century along with silver and gold bars, as well as silver and gold coins weighed in tiền. Denominations up to ten tiền were minted, with the seven tiền coins in gold and silver being similar in size and weight to the Spanish eight real and eight escudo pieces. These coins continued to be minted into the 20th century, albeit increasingly supplanted by French colonial coinage.

During the middle of the 1880s there was a shortage of cash coins in the Qing dynasty province of Guangdong, to remedy this Chinese bankers who were active in Vietnam at the time started buying up zinc Vietnamese cash coins to export to Guangdong. During the narrowly defined period ranging from around 1885 to about the 1890s a large quantities of zinc Vietnamese cash coins circulated in the Guangdong Province. However, like the then-scarce Chinese cash coins, the Vietnamese cash coins brought to Guangdong would be sold and exported to overseas Chinese communities in the United States for a profit causing the demand for small denomination cash coins to remain high. It wasn't until 1889 when the Guangzhou Mint started mass-producing high-quality machine-struck brass cash coins that the Vietnamese cash coins would disappear from circulation in Guangdong.

The Chinese abandonment of the Vietnamese zinc cash coins in Guangdong was both rapid and absolute and by the 1890s indigenous machine-struck cash coins made of brass had fully replaced them, as everyone (even those in Vietnam) always preferred the copper-alloy (including brass) cash coins to those made of zinc. Likewise, Chinese customers in the American state of California would have been similarly discriminating quickly ending the demand for zinc Vietnamese cash coins outside of Vietnam. This is also why Vietnamese cash coins are occasionally found in Chinese and overseas Chinese coin hoards dating to the 1880s and later (but never before as up until that point Vietnamese cash coins exclusively circulated in Vietnam).

The Vietnamese cash coins found in Guangdong from this period (and among overseas Guangdongers) range from the Gia Long to the Tự Đức period.

After the introduction of modern coinage by the French in 1878, cash coins remained in general circulation in French Cochinchina.

Initially the French attempted to supplement cash coins in circulation by punching round holes into French 1 centime coins and shipping a large amount of them to French Cochinchina, but these coins did not see much circulation and the Cochinchinese people largely rejected them.

On 7 April and 22 April 1879, the governor of French Cochinchina had decreed that the new designs for coins with Cochinchine Française on them would be accepted with the denominations 2 sapèques (cash coins), 1 cent, 10 cents, 20 cents, 50 cents, and the piastre. All coins except for the piastre were allowed to be issued, which allowed for Spanish dollars and Mexican reals to continue circulating. The Paris Mint produced the new machine-struck 2 sapèques Cochinchine Française cash coins. These French-produced bronze cash coins weighed 2 grams and were valued at 1/500 piastre. They saw considerably more circulation than the previous French attempt at creating cash coins, but were still largely disliked by the Cochinchinese people. The local population still preferred their own Tự Đức Thông Bảo (嗣德通寶) cash coins despite only being valued at 1/1000 piastre.

==== Under French rule ====
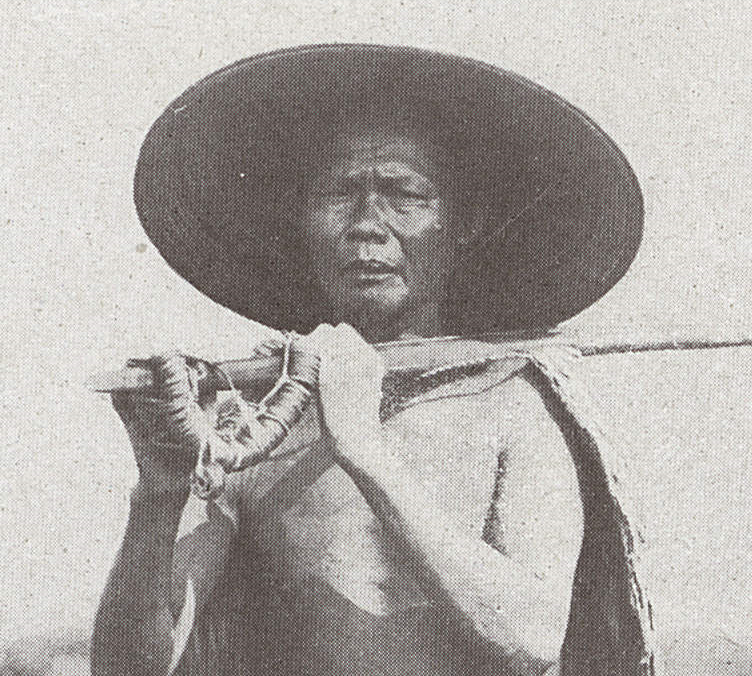
A rural man carrying a string of cash coins (1919).

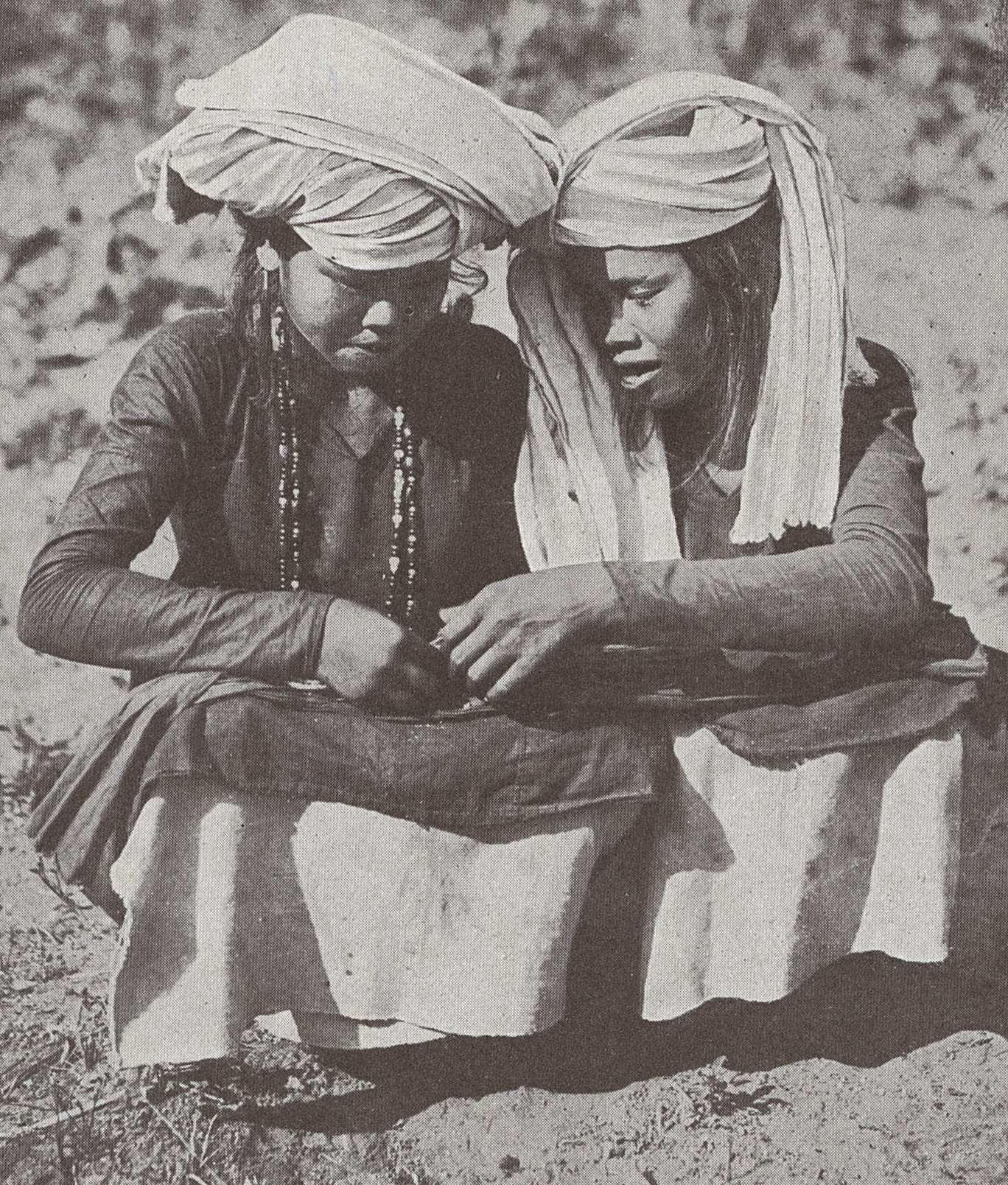
Two ethnic Cham women counting cash coins (1919).

In the year 1883 the Harmand Treaty was signed, which was replaced in 1884 with the Patenôtre Treaty. These treaties were created following the French conquest of Đại Nam, which established the French protectorates of Annam and Tonkin. While these two countries were in a subordinate relationship with France, they were still nominally ruled by the Nguyễn Empire and the old currency system continued to be used and produced by the government of the Nguyễn dynasty there. Despite the later introduction of the French Indochinese piastre, zinc and copper-alloy cash coins would continue to circulate among the Vietnamese populace throughout the country as the primary form of coinage, as the majority of the population lived in extreme poverty until 1945 (and 1948 in some areas). They were valued at the rates of about 500–600 cash coins for one piastre. The need for coins was only a minor part in the lives of most Vietnamese people at the time, as bartering remained more common since all coins were bartered on the market according to their current intrinsic values.

During the Kiến Phúc period (2 December 1883 – 31 July 1884), the regent Nguyễn Văn Tường accepted bribes from Qing Chinese merchants to allow them to bring their tiền sềnh (錢浧, "extraordinary money") depicting the reign era of the Tự Đức Emperor into the country. Nguyễn Văn Tường forced people to accept and spend this bad quality Chinese imitation money, those who refused to accept it could face the penalty of arrest. This money is described as being "very ugly, too thin, and extremely light" (weighing only about 1 gram), according to descriptions it was so light in fact that these cash coins can float on water. Roman Catholic missionaries active in Đại Nam took advantage of bad condition of this new money to propagate the idea that it was a sign that the Nguyễn dynasty was in decline. These cash coins have sometimes been mistaken for the 17th and 18th century Tiền gián (with the inscriptions of Thiên Thánh Nguyên Bảo and An Pháp Nguyên Bảo). However, these earlier low quality money was still heavier and more valuable than the nearly worthless tiền sềnh brought into the country by merchants from the Qing dynasty by the end of the 19th century.

Following the establishment of French Indochina, a new version of the French 2 sapèques was produced from 1887 to 1902, which was also valued at 1/500 piastre and was likely forced on the Vietnamese when they were paid for their goods and services by the French, as the preference still was for indigenous cash coins.

Under French administration the Nguyễn government issued the Kiến Phúc Thông Bảo (建福通寶), Hàm Nghi Thông Bảo (咸宜通寶), Đồng Khánh Thông Bảo (同慶通寶), Thành Thái Thông Bảo (成泰通寶), Duy Tân Thông Bảo (維新通寶) cash coins of different metal compositions and weights. Each of these cash coins had their own value against the French Indochinese piastre. Because the exchange values between the native cash coins and silver piastres were confusing, the local Vietnamese people were often cheated by the money changers during this period.

The Kiến Phúc Thông Bảo was mixed with iron when it was minted and featured blank reverse sides. Several batches of Kiến Phúc Thông Bảo cash coins were produced, but due to the fact that the French Army was putting pressure on the Huế Court the throne changed hands several times and the rule of the Kiến Phúc Emperor was very brief, so not much attention to the economy was paid by government. Because of these factors only a very small number of Kiến Phúc Thông Bảo cash coins were minted which confirm the new Emperor's reign era name, but they didn't have a large effect on the money in circulation as their quantity was too small to make a difference. The Hàm Nghi Thông Bảo cash coins were likewise only minted in small quantities due to his short reign. These cash coins were made from copper-alloys and have the inscription "Lục Văn" (六文) on their reverse indicating their denomination.

During the reign of the Đồng Khánh Emperor two series of Đồng Khánh Thông Bảo cash coins were minted; the first series were cast in 1776 with a diameter of 26 millimeters, and the second series in 1887 with a diameter of 23 millimeters. All cash coins from this era had blank reverse sides.

In 1894, the Note sur la circulation monétaire et les moyens d'échange dans les colonies françaises et pays de protectorat, d'après les documents officiels recueillis par l'administration des colonies reported that aside from the piastre and zinc and copper-alloy cash coins other indigenous currencies circulated in the Nguyễn dynasty, these included a silver cash coin which was valued at 2 strings each, a silver sycee weighing 1 Lượng was valued at 12 strings, a silver Nen was valued at 140 strings, a gold Lượng valued at 300 strings, and a gold Nen valued at 3000 strings. It was reported that Asian merchants used conventional silver bars made from melted coins that were withdrawn from circulation, these were valued at 15 piastres. In Tonkin zinc cash coins remained in circulation while they only continued to circulate in some regions of Annam.

In 1894 a string of cash coins in Tonkin was composed of 600 zinc cash coins divided into rows of 10 coins each (called a tiền), while in Annam a string was composed of 100 copper-alloy cash coins divided into rows of 10. At the time 8~10 strings of cash coins were worth a piastre. In the French protectorate of Cambodia a string would contain 450 to 500 Vietnamese cash coins, with 8 cash coins being valued at 1 cent.

On 1 August 1898 it was reported in the Bulletin Economique De L’Indo-Chine article; Le Monnaie De L’Annam that the Huế Mint was closed in 1887, and in 1894 the casting of cash coins had started at the Thanh Hóa Mint. Between the years 1889 and 1890 the Huế Mint produced 1321 strings of 600 small brass Thành Thái Thông Bảo cash coins. These small brass cash coins were valued at six zinc cash coins. In the year 1893, large brass Thành Thái Thông Bảo cash coins with a denomination of ten văn (十文, thập văn), or ten zinc cash coins, started being produced by the Huế Mint. The production of Thành Thái Thông Bảo cash coins were resumed at the Thanh Hóa Mint between the years 1894 and 1899. Under Emperor Thành Thái gold and silver coinages were also produced.

In the year 1902 the French ceased production of machine-struck cash coins at the Paris Mint and completely deferred the production of cash coins back to the government of the Nguyễn dynasty. There were people in Hanoi and Saigon that still preferred the French machine-struck cash coins, so a committee was set up in Hanoi that created a machine-struck zinc cash coin valued at 1/600 piastre dated 1905 but issued in 1906. However, this series of cash coins was not well received by either the local or the French population as the coins were brittle, prone to corrosion, and easily broken, so their production was quickly halted.

In order to try to standardise the exchange rate between the French Indochinese piastre and cash coins, the Resident-Superior of the French protectorate of Tonkin fixed the local Tonkinese exchange rates every month. This was done to prevent rampant speculation by Chinese merchants and Nguyễn dynasty mandarins. Money changers generally tended to value the piastre based on its weight in silver, but also according to the perfection of its strike, and even according to the purity of its silver. The official exchange rates were not rigorously applied and the money changers often estimated their own values to individual piastre coins.

In order to combat deflation both the Government-General of French Indochina and the imperial government of the Nguyễn dynasty fixed the exchange rate of the newly introduced Khải Định Thông Bảo at 6 zinc cash coins according to an ordonnance entitled Fixing the exchange of the new cash coins bearing the reign era of Khải Định (Fixant la valeur d'échange de la nouvelle sapèque portant la chiffre de Règne Khai-Dinh) signed on 01-09-Khải Định 5 (12 October 1920) by five of the six ministers of the Nguyễn dynasty, the Khải Định Emperor, and the Governor-General of French Indochina Maurice Long. The imperial ordonnance noted that in the French protectorate of Tonkin the Gia Long Thông Bảo (嘉隆通寶) and the Minh Mạng Thông Bảo (明命通寶) as well as zinc cash coins were unanimously accepted, while the Thiệu Trị Thông Bảo (紹治通寶) and the Tự Đức Thông Bảo (嗣德通寶) cash coins weren't accepted by the local population. Meanwhile in the provinces of Nghệ An and Thanh Hóa they would sometimes all be accepted but at other times they would be refused like they were in Tonkin. The ordonnance stated that the people of Đại Nam are "warned that cash coins are for their daily life and serve as an article of their very first necessity" and that "there is no worse malaise than the scarcity of cash coins", while emphasising that the production costs of the currency is higher than their nominal and market value and that their continued production constitutes a heavy burden both for the French Indochinese and Nguyễn dynasty governments, but that the government prefers to bear this burden than let the people suffer from the negative consequences of their scarcity.

The last monarch whose name was cast on cash coins, Emperor Bảo Đại, died in 1997.

==== Scarcity of cash coins during the Bảo Đại period ====
In 1932 it was reported by L'Éveil économique de l'Indochine ("The Economic Awakening of Indochina") that cash coins were increasingly becoming scarce in Annam and Tonkin, the L'Éveil économique de l'Indochine advised the government of the Nguyễn dynasty to start producing zinc Bảo Đại Thông Bảo cash coins to counter the scarcity of low denomination currencies, at this time zinc cash coins were still circulating in Annam while very few of them were left in Tonkin.

In 1936 the House of Representatives of the People of Annam wrote in an advisory report, after an in-depth investigation, that they advised the French and Nguyễn governments against demonetising and replacing old cash coins in favour of a new uniform cash coin. They argued that while the new ½ cent coins were received without much difficulty, their quantity was still insufficient and their circulation too limited for them to be able to serve as a basis for an operation to withdraw older cash coins from circulation. Therefore, the House of Representatives proposed a solution by not withdrawing old cash coins from circulation through the production of a new unit to replace them, but by introducing a new uniform cash coin to circulate alongside old cash coins and unifying their exchange courses with cash coins whose demonetisation is very difficult, which would allow for their exchange courses to stabilise in relation to the ½ cent coins as more of the latter would be brought into the market to circulate.

On 29 September 1939 the Hanoian newspaper l'Effort Indochinois reported that the governments of French Indochina and the Nguyễn dynasty pursued a policy called an muoi (the introduction of large denomination debased cash coins which only had a slightly higher intrinsic value to drive out lower value cash coins), which sought to stabilise the exchange rate between cash coins and the piastre at 360:1. During this period there was a market liquidity crisis worsened by the hoarding of low denomination cash coins by the general populace causing massive deflation of cash coins. There has been a serious devaluation of the piastre in Annam, among the solutions proposed by the government of French Indochina was the increased production of paper money. Despite starting the an muoi policy in 1937, by 1939 the exchange rate between the piastre and cash coins was at 5 strings per piastre while in some rural areas the price of the piastre went down as much as 3 strings per piastre.

The deflation of cash coins proved to be very detrimental to the economy and local trade. The reason why these exchange rates were unstable was because cash coins remained independent of the piastre, despite their fixed exchange rates. l'Effort Indochinois reported that in Tonkin the Khải Định Thông Bảo and Bảo Đại Thông Bảo cash coins were less sensitive to the deflationary pressure caused by hoarding than older cash coins as they weren't being overvalued in the market in relation to the French Indochinese piastre. As Tonkinese people had a much higher standard of living than the Annamites, the velocity of money was likewise faster and coins like the 10 cents, 20 cents, Etc. mingled more with the cash coins in Tonkin than they did in Annam.

l'Effort Indochinois noted that many causes of the deflation and hoarding were more psychological in nature rather than practical, noting that the new cash coins that were being produced in Tonkin was manufactured in a different way from the old ones (machine-struck vs. cast) and that this development was even more recent than banknotes. Meanwhile, in Annam large quantities of Minh Mạng Thông Bảo, Thiệu Trị Thông Bảo, Etc. as well as millennium old cash coins remained in circulation as the population stubbornly held onto them. In fact, there remained a strong preference for cast Bảo Đại Thông Bảo cash coins over machine-struck ones of the same inscription. This was as the population preferred to keep with the traditional currency system and that cast cash coins were seen as "good old sapèques" from "the good old days" as opposed to both machine-struck cash coins and the French Indochinese piastre who saw it as "modern inventions incompatible with their traditional lifestyles". To combat this mentality l'Effort Indochinois advised the government to mint cash coins of different models and metals and to give them a clearly defined value in relation to the divisionaries of the piastre and introduce them to the Annamese countryside, as well as to introduce the machine-struck Bảo Đại Thông Bảo that were already circulating in Tonkin into rural Annam.

On 9 August 1941 the Ministry of Finance of the imperial government of the Nguyễn dynasty issued an act informing the provincial mandarins of Annam on how to enforce new rules set up by the Nguyễn dynasty government to try to curb deflation. According to the Minister of Finance Hồ Đắc Khải the fall in the market exchange rates between cash coins and piastres (especially in the Thanh Hóa, Nghệ An, and Hà Tĩnh provinces) wasn't solely caused by the scarcity of cash coins but also by false rumours spread by illicit currency speculators who sought to devalue the French Indochinese piastre in relation to cash coins to later exchange their hoarded cash coins at higher rates making a profit. The increased value of cash coins relative to the piastre also lead to a general increase in the cost of living as well as making commercial transactions less convenient for the majority of the population, who typically relied on cash coins to pay for their common purchases. Hồ Đắc Khải noted that the two governments (both the governments of French Indochina and the Nguyễn dynasty) sought to remedy the situation, with one of the remedies being the issuance of a large number of ¼ cent, ½ cent, and 1 coins to help alleviate the need for low value coinages due to the scarcity of cash coins.

While waiting for the government to be in a position to ensure a radical reform of the monetary system in Annam, the Nguyễn dynasty government adopted a number of temporary measures to try to counter the deflation caused by the scarcity of cash coins in 1941 and the instable monetary situation in the Thanh-Nghệ-Tĩnh region. In 1941 the official exchange rate between cash coins and the French Indochinese piastre was set at 6 strings of 50 cash coins per piastre, but the market rate was either at 2 or 3 strings of 50 cash coins per piastre. For that reason the Ministry of Finance petitioned the Bảo Đại Emperor to issue an imperial decree (諭, dụ) which would fix the exchange rate at 4 strings of cash coins per piastre with any deviation of this rate becoming punishable by high sanctions. Immediately after the issuance of this decree the provincial mandarins could enforce it together with French provincial residents.

Besides the fixed exchange rates, other measures taken to attempt to alleviate the scarcity of cash coins included limiting the amount of strings of cash coins that a family may own to a maximum of 200 strings per household and 400 strings of cash coins per merchant establishment with the surplus of this authorised quantity being placed back into general circulation by exchanging the surplus strings of cash coins with banknotes to individuals at the official exchange rate of 4 strings per piastre. Any excess strings of cash coins held by an individual had to be legally declared to the local prefect (Tri phủ), district magistrate (Tri huyện), or the Bang-ta who would then centralise the declarations of the hoarders and send reports to the provincial mandarins. If the stock of cash coins was large enough, the provincial mandarins could distribute the stored cash coins among the various districts of their province. Private individuals would then be able to exchange their banknotes for the redistributed cash coins at the official exchange rate with each family (household) being limited to a maximum of 20 strings.

In order to enable the administration to exercise control over the situation of cash coins, any person who has received and held, after the previous exchange, a quantity of cash coins greater than 200 strings for individuals and 400 strings for merchants, was required to report the movement of cash coins held during these periods to the heads of the districts concerned around the 1st and 15th of each month. If someone failed to report any cash coins in excess of the permitted quantity, the authorities could confiscate their cash coins as a penalty to benefit the budget of the government of the Nguyễn dynasty, mostly to pay the salaries of the local mandarins and government employees in cash coins instead of paying them using fiduciary banknotes.

On Decree Number 55 dated 02-07-Bảo Đại 16 (24 August 1941) the Bảo Đại Emperor issued an ordonnance which states that within the entire territory of Trung Kỳ (Annam) the exchange rate between copper-alloy cash coins and the piastre was fixed at a rate of 4 strings of cash coins for 1 French Indochinese piastre, replacing the earlier Decree Number 1 of 21 February 1934 which fixed it at 6 strings of 50 cash coins. This decree applied to any cash coin bearing a reign era of the Nguyễn dynasty, with the definition of 4 strings of cash coins consisting of either 400 an-sau (6 văn) cash coins or 240 an-muoi (10 văn) cash coins.

=== Democratic Republic of Vietnam ===
After the Democratic Republic of Vietnam declared their independence in 1945 they began issuing their own money, but cash coins continued to circulate in the remote areas of Bắc Bộ and Trung Bộ where there was a lack of xu, hào, and đồng coins for the population. The Democratic Republic of Viet Nam Decree 51/SL of 6 January 1947 officially set the exchange rate at twenty Vietnamese cash coins for one North Vietnamese đồng making them equal to five xu each. Vietnamese cash coins continued to officially circulate in the Democratic Republic of Vietnam until 13 April 1948.

=== Aftermath ===
During the Vietnam War a large number of Vietnamese numismatic charms with both authentic as well as fantasy coin inscriptions were produced in South Vietnam to be sold to foreigners interested in collecting Vietnamese antiques. These fantasy inscriptions included legends like Quang Trung Trọng Bảo (光中重寶), Hàm Nghi Trọng Bảo (咸宜重寶), and Khải Định Trọng Bảo (啓定重寶), the latter of which was based on the Khải Định Thông Bảo (啓定通寶).

== List of Vietnamese cash coins ==
=== Official and semi-official cash coins ===
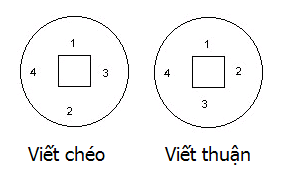
Most Vietnamese cash coins tend to be read top-bottom-right-left, but variants exist where the characters are read clockwise.

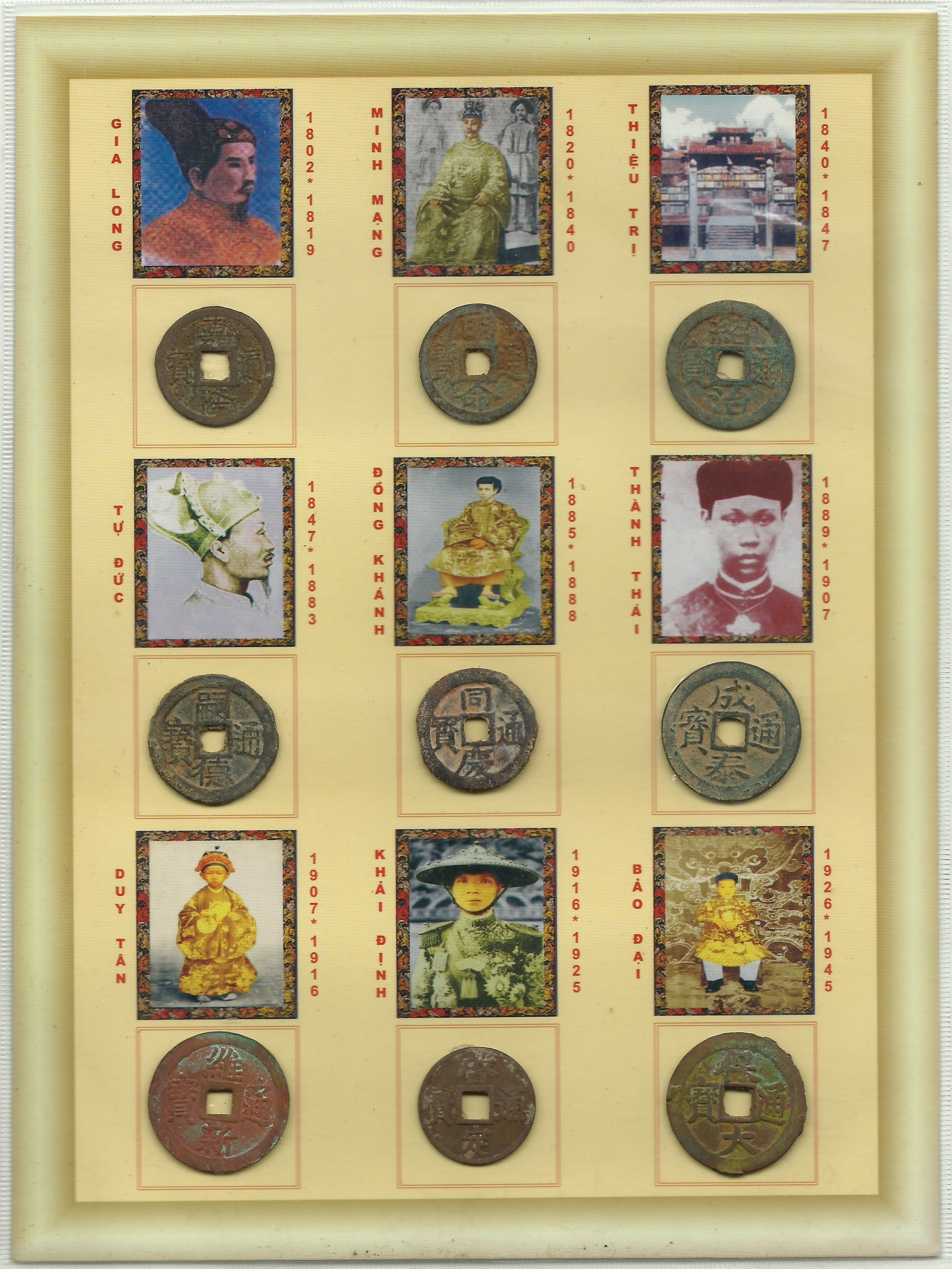
The various cash coins of the Nguyễn dynasty (1802–1945).

During the almost 1000 years that Vietnamese copper cash coins were produced, they often significantly changed quality, alloy, size, and workmanship. In general, the coins bear the era name(s) of the monarch (Niên hiệu/年號) but may also be inscribed with mint marks, denominations, miscellaneous characters, and decorations.

Unlike Chinese, Korean, Japanese, and Ryūkyūan cash coins that always have the inscription in only one typeface, Vietnamese cash coins tend to be more idiosyncratic, bearing sometimes Regular script, Seal script, and even Running script on the same coins for different characters, and it is not uncommon for one coin to be cast almost entirely in one typeface but with an odd character in another. Though early Vietnamese coins often bore the calligraphic style of the Chinese Khai Nguyên Thông Bảo (開元通寶) coin, especially those from the Đinh until the Trần dynasties.

The following coins were produced to circulate in Vietnam:

Orange text indicates that the cash coin has been mentioned by historical sources but that no modern authentic specimen has ever been recovered.

Green text indicates that this cash coin has been recovered in modern times but is not mentioned in any historical chronicles.

Blue text indicates that the cash coin has its own article on Wikipedia. (Note: The colour turns purple if you have visited the page in the past.)

(中) indicates that there exists a Chinese, Khitan, Tangut, Jurchen, Mongol, and/or Manchu cash coin (including rebel coinages) with the same legend as the Vietnamese cash coin.
Further reading: List of Chinese cash coins by inscription.

Fuchsia text = Indicates that this is a misattributed cash coin (these cash coins were noted by historical sources or standard catalogues but later turned out to be misattributed).

Gold text Indicates that this is a fake or fantasy referenced by Eduardo Toda y Güell in his Annam and its Minor Currency (pdf), the possible existence of these cash coins have not been verified by any later works.

Inscription (chữ Quốc ngữ)	Inscription (chữ Hán)	Years of mintage	Dynasty	Monarch(s)	Toda image	Image
Thái Bình Hưng Bảo (Note: The reign title was "Thái Bình" (太平) but the actual inscription of the coinage reads "Đại Bình Hưng Bảo" (大平興寶).)	太平興寶	970–979	Đinh (丁)	Đinh Tiên Hoàng (丁先皇); Đinh Phế Đế (丁廢帝)		
Thiên Phúc Trấn Bảo	天福鎮寶	986	Early Lê (前黎)	Lê Hoàn (黎桓)		
Lê	黎	986	Early Lê (前黎)	Lê Hoàn (黎桓)		None
Thuận Thiên Đại Bảo	順天大寶	1010–1028	Lý (李)	Lý Thái Tổ (李太祖)		
Càn Phù Nguyên Bảo	乾符元寶	1039–1041	Lý (李)	Lý Thái Tông (李太宗)		
Minh Đạo Nguyên Bảo (中)	明道元寶	1042–1043	Lý (李)	Lý Thái Tông (李太宗)	None	
Thiên Phù Thông Bảo (Note: "Uncertain attribution".)	天符通寶	1120–1127	Lý (李)	Lý Nhân Tông (李仁宗)	None	
Thiên Phù Nguyên Bảo (Note: This cash coin is listed in Barker's Cash coins of Viet Nam but his example is a private issue of about 1580. No dynastic cash coin with this inscription is known to exist.)	天符元寶	1120–1127	Lý (李)	Lý Nhân Tông (李仁宗)		None
Đại Định Thông Bảo (中)	大定通寶	1140–1162	Lý (李)	Lý Anh Tông (李英宗)		
Thiên Cảm Thông Bảo	天感通寶	1044–1048	Lý (李)	Lý Anh Tông (李英宗)		None
Thiên Cảm Nguyên Bảo	天感元寶	1174–1175	Lý (李)	Lý Anh Tông (李英宗)	None	
Chính Long Nguyên Bảo	正隆元寶	1174–1175	Lý (李)	Lý Anh Tông (李英宗)	None	
Thiên Tư Thông Bảo	天資通寶	1202–1204	Lý (李)	Lý Cao Tông (李高宗)		None
Thiên Tư Nguyên Bảo	天資元寶	1202–1204	Lý (李)	Lý Cao Tông (李高宗)	None	
Trị Bình Thông Bảo (中) (Note: This is a privately produced cash coin which was falsely attributed to the Lý dynasty by Eduardo Toda y Güell, many of them are actually from the 1500s -1800s)	治平通寶	1205–1210	Lý (李)	Lý Cao Tông (李高宗)		None
Trị Bình Nguyên Bảo	治平元寶	1205–1210	Lý (李)	Lý Cao Tông (李高宗)		
Hàm Bình Nguyên Bảo (中) (Note: This is a privately produced cash coin from the 1500s which has nothing to do with the Lý dynasty.)	咸平元寶	1205–1210	Lý (李)	Lý Cao Tông (李高宗)	None	
Kiến Trung Thông Bảo (中)	建中通寶	1225–1237	Trần (陳)	Trần Thái Tông (陳太宗)	None	
Trần Nguyên Thông Bảo	陳元通寶	1225–1237	Trần (陳)	Trần Thái Tông (陳太宗)	None	
Chính Bình Thông Bảo	政平通寶	1238–1350	Trần (陳)	Trần Thái Tông (陳太宗)	None	
Nguyên Phong Thông Bảo (中)	元豐通寶	1251–1258	Trần (陳)	Trần Thái Tông (陳太宗)		
Thiệu Long Thông Bảo	紹隆通寶	1258–1272	Trần (陳)	Trần Thánh Tông (陳聖宗)	None	
Hoàng Trần Thông Bảo	皇陳通寶	1258–1278	Trần (陳)	Trần Thánh Tông (陳聖宗)	None	
Hoàng Trần Nguyên Bảo	皇陳元寶	1258–1278	Trần (陳)	Trần Thánh Tông (陳聖宗)	None	
Khai Thái Nguyên Bảo	開太元寶	1324–1329	Trần (陳)	Trần Minh Tông (陳明宗)	None	
Thiệu Phong Thông Bảo	紹豐通寶	1341–1357	Trần (陳)	Trần Dụ Tông (陳裕宗)	None	
Thiệu Phong Bình Bảo	紹豐平寶	1341–1357	Trần (陳)	Trần Dụ Tông (陳裕宗)		
Thiệu Phong Nguyên Bảo	紹豐元寶	1341–1357	Trần (陳)	Trần Dụ Tông (陳裕宗)		
Đại Trị Thông Bảo	大治通寶	1358–1369	Trần (陳)	Trần Dụ Tông (陳裕宗)		
Đại Trị Nguyên Bảo	大治元寶	1358–1369	Trần (陳)	Trần Dụ Tông (陳裕宗)		
Đại Trị Nguyên Bảo	大治元寶	1358–1369	Trần (陳)	Trần Dụ Tông (陳裕宗)	None	
Cảm Thiệu Nguyên Bảo	感紹元寶	1368–1370	Trần (陳)	Hôn Đức Công (昏德公)		
Cảm Thiệu Nguyên Bảo	感紹元宝	1368–1370	Trần (陳)	Hôn Đức Công (昏德公)		
Đại Định Thông Bảo (中)	大定通寶	1368–1370	Trần (陳)	Hôn Đức Công (昏德公)	None	
Thiệu Khánh Thông Bảo	紹慶通寶	1370–1372	Trần (陳)	Trần Nghệ Tông (陳藝宗)	None	
Xương Phù Thông Bảo	昌符通寶	1377–1388	Trần (陳)	Trần Phế Đế (陳廢帝)	None	
Hi Nguyên Thông Bảo (Note: This cash coin was privately produced and is considered to be falsely attributed to Nguyễn Hi Nguyên (阮熙元) by some scholars.)	熙元通寶	1381–1382	None	Nguyễn Hi Nguyên (阮熙元)		
Thiên Thánh Nguyên Bảo	天聖元寶	1391–1392	None	Sử Thiên Thánh (使天聖)		
Thánh Nguyên Thông Bảo	聖元通寶	1400	Hồ (胡)	Hồ Quý Ly (胡季犛)		
Thiệu Nguyên Thông Bảo (Note: These cash coins turned out to be a series of private coins similar to the official Hồ style. However no such reign title existed under the reign of the Hồ dynasty.)	紹元通寶	1401–1402	Hồ (胡)	Hồ Hán Thương (胡漢蒼)		
Hán Nguyên Thông Bảo (中) (Note: These cash coins turned out to be privately produced issue from the early 1600s, they are reign title copies of Chinese cash coins but are listed in numismatic literature.)	漢元通寶	1401–1407	Hồ (胡)	Hồ Hán Thương (胡漢蒼)		
Hán Nguyên Thánh Bảo	漢元聖寶	1401–1407	Hồ (胡)	Hồ Hán Thương (胡漢蒼)		
Thiên Bình Thông Bảo (Note: This cash coin turned out to be a Ming trade cash coin which was cast around the year 1590 at Quanzhou, Fujian.)	天平通寶	1405–1406	None	Thiên Bình (天平)		
Vĩnh Ninh Thông Bảo	永寧通寶	1420	None	Lộc Bình Vương (羅平王)		
Giao Chỉ Thông Bảo (Note: during the Chinese (Minh dynasty) occupation these coins were issued as payments to Chinese soldiers, Giao Chỉ Thông Bảo coins are poorly made from lead and sand.)	交趾通寶	1419	Minh (明)	Vĩnh Lạc Emperor (永樂帝)		None
Vĩnh Thiên Thông Bảo	永天通寶	1420	None	Lê Ngạ (黎餓)	None	
Thiên Khánh Thông Bảo (中)	天慶通寶	1426–1428	Later Trần (後陳)	Thiên Khánh Đế (天慶帝)	None	
An Pháp Nguyên Bảo	安法元寶	Rebellion (Note: Coins issued during the Lam Sơn uprising were cast as payment for the anti-Chinese rebels.)	Later Lê (後黎)	Lê Lợi (黎利)		
Chánh Pháp Nguyên Bảo (Note: This cash coin was attributed to Lê Lợi (黎利) by Eduardo Toda y Güell, but later turned out to be private issue from about 1600.)	正法元寶	Rebellion	Later Lê (後黎)	Lê Lợi (黎利)		
Trị Thánh Nguyên Bảo (Note: This cash coin was attributed to Lê Lợi (黎利) by Eduardo Toda y Güell, but later turned out to be private issue produced between the years 1750 and 1850.)	治聖元寶	Rebellion	Later Lê (後黎)	Lê Lợi (黎利)		
Trị Thánh Bình Bảo (Note: This cash coin was attributed to Lê Lợi (黎利) by Eduardo Toda y Güell, but later turned out to be private issue produced after the year 1600.)	治聖平寶	Rebellion	Later Lê (後黎)	Lê Lợi (黎利)		
Thái Pháp Bình Bảo	太法平寶	Rebellion	Later Lê (後黎)	Lê Lợi (黎利)		None
Thánh Quan Thông Bảo (Note: This cash coin turned out to be a rare private cash coin made during a brief Trần restoration in the early 1500s. Unlike what Toda claimed it is not made from tin and lead, but a hard white bronze composition.)	聖宮通寶	Rebellion	Later Lê (後黎)	Lê Lợi (黎利)		
Thuận Thiên Thông Bảo	順天通寶	1428–1433	Later Lê (後黎)	Lê Thái Tổ (黎太祖)	None	
Thuận Thiên Nguyên Bảo (中)	順天元寶	1428–1433	Later Lê (後黎)	Lê Thái Tổ (黎太祖)		
Thiệu Bình Thông Bảo	紹平通寶	1434–1440	Later Lê (後黎)	Lê Thái Tông (黎太宗)		
Đại Bảo Thông Bảo	大寶通寶	1440–1442	Later Lê (後黎)	Lê Thái Tông (黎太宗)		
Thái Hòa Thông Bảo (Note: Despite bearing the reign title "Thái Hòa Thông Bảo" all coins actually bear the inscription "Đại Hòa Thông Bảo" (大和通寶).)	太和通寶	1443–1453	Later Lê (後黎)	Lê Nhân Tông (黎仁宗)		
Diên Ninh Thông Bảo	延寧通寶	1454–1459	Later Lê (後黎)	Lê Nhân Tông (黎仁宗)		
Thiên Hưng Thông Bảo	天興通寶	1459–1460	Later Lê (後黎)	Lê Nghi Dân (黎宜民)		
Quang Thuận Thông Bảo	光順通寶	1460–1469	Later Lê (後黎)	Lê Thánh Tông (黎聖宗)		
Hồng Đức Thông Bảo	洪德通寶	1470–1497	Later Lê (後黎)	Lê Thánh Tông (黎聖宗)		
Cảnh Thống Thông Bảo	景統通寶	1497–1504	Later Lê (後黎)	Lê Hiến Tông (黎憲宗)		
Đoan Khánh Thông Bảo	端慶通寶	1505–1509	Later Lê (後黎)	Lê Uy Mục (黎威穆)		
Giao Trị Thông Bảo	交治通寶	1509	None	Cẩm Giang Vương (錦江王)		
Thái Bình Thông Bảo	太平通寶	1509	None	Cẩm Giang Vương (錦江王)		
Thái Bình Thánh Bảo	太平聖寶	1509	None	Cẩm Giang Vương (錦江王)		
Hồng Thuận Thông Bảo	洪順通寶	1510–1516	Later Lê (後黎)	Lê Tương Dực (黎襄翼)		
Trần Công Tân Bảo	陳公新寶	1511–1512	None	Trần Tuân (陳珣) or Trần Công Ninh (陳公寧)		
Quang Thiệu Thông Bảo	光紹通寶	1516–1522	Later Lê (後黎)	Lê Chiêu Tông (黎昭宗)		
Thiên Ứng Thông Bảo	天應通寶	1516–1521	None	Trần Cao (陳暠)		
Phật Pháp Tăng Bảo	佛法僧寶	1516–1521	None	Trần Cao (陳暠)	None	
Tuyên Hựu Hòa Bảo	宣祐和寶	1516–1521	None	Trần Cao (陳暠)	None	
Thống Nguyên Thông Bảo	統元通寶	1522–1527	Later Lê (後黎)	Lê Cung Hoàng (黎恭皇)		
Minh Đức Thông Bảo	明德通寶	1527–1530	Mạc (莫)	Mạc Thái Tổ (莫太祖)		
Minh Đức Nguyên Bảo	明德元寶	1527–1530	Mạc (莫)	Mạc Thái Tổ (莫太祖)		
Đại Chính Thông Bảo	大正通寶	1530–1540	Mạc (莫)	Mạc Thái Tông (莫太宗)		
Quang Thiệu Thông Bảo	光紹通寶	1531–1532	None	Quang Thiệu Emperor (光紹帝)		
Nguyên Hòa Thông Bảo	元和通寶	1533–1548	Revival Lê (黎中興)	Lê Trang Tông (黎莊宗)		
Quảng Hòa Thông Bảo	廣和通寶	1541–1546	Mạc (莫)	Mạc Hiến Tông (莫憲宗)		
Vĩnh Định Thông Bảo	永定通寶	1547	Mạc (莫)	Mạc Tuyên Tông (莫宣宗)		
Vĩnh Định Chí Bảo	永定之寶	1547	Mạc (莫)	Mạc Tuyên Tông (莫宣宗)		
Quang Bảo Thông Bảo	光寶通寶	1554–1561	Mạc (莫)	Mạc Tuyên Tông (莫宣宗)	None	
Thái Bình Thông Bảo (中)	太平通寶	1558–1613	Nguyễn lords (阮主)	Nguyễn Hoàng (阮潢)	None	
Thái Bình Phong Bảo	太平豐寶	1558–1613	Nguyễn lords (阮主)	Nguyễn Hoàng (阮潢)	None	
Bình An Thông Bảo	平安通寶	1572–1623	Trịnh lords (鄭主)	Trịnh Tùng (鄭松)	None	
Gia Thái Thông Bảo (中)	嘉泰通寶	1573–1599	Revival Lê (黎中興)	Lê Thế Tông (黎世宗)	None	
Càn Thống Nguyên Bảo	乾統元寶	1593–1625	Mạc (莫) (Note: From this point onwards the monarchs of the Mạc dynasty were only in control of the Cao Bằng Province, which they had declared as an independent country for 75 years.)	Mạc Kính Cung (莫敬恭)	None	
An Pháp Nguyên Bảo	安法元寶	1593–1625	Mạc (莫)	Mạc Kính Cung (莫敬恭)	None	
Thái Bình Thông Bảo (中)	太平通寶	1593–1625	Mạc (莫)	Mạc Kính Cung (莫敬恭)	None	
Thái Bình Thánh Bảo	太平聖寶	1593–1625	Mạc (莫)	Mạc Kính Cung (莫敬恭)	None	
Thái Bình Pháp Bảo	太平法寶	1593–1625	Mạc (莫)	Mạc Kính Cung (莫敬恭)	None	
Khai Kiến Thông Bảo	開建通寶	1593–1625	Mạc (莫)	Mạc Kính Cung (莫敬恭)		
Sùng Minh Thông Bảo	崇明通寶	1593–1625	Mạc (莫)	Mạc Kính Cung (莫敬恭)		
Chính Nguyên Thông Bảo	正元通寶	1593–1625	Mạc (莫)	Mạc Kính Cung (莫敬恭)	None	
Vĩnh Thọ Thông Bảo	永壽通寶	1658–1661	Revival Lê (黎中興)	Lê Thần Tông (黎神宗)		
Tường Phù Nguyên Bảo (Note: The "Tường Phù Nguyên Bảo" (祥符元寶), "Trị Bình Thông Bảo" (治平通寶), and "Trị Bình Nguyên Bảo" (治平元寶) were Japanese trade coins minted in Nagasaki for trade with Vietnam and the Netherlands. In Vietnam they were imported by the Nguyễn lords.) (中)	祥符元寶	1659–1685	Đức Xuyên (徳川)	Đức Xuyên Gia Cương (徳川 家綱)	None	
Trị Bình Thông Bảo (中)	治平通寶	1659–1685	Đức Xuyên (徳川)	Đức Xuyên Gia Cương (徳川 家綱)	None	None
Trị Bình Nguyên Bảo (中)	治平元寶	1659–1685	Đức Xuyên (徳川)	Đức Xuyên Gia Cương (徳川 家綱)	None	
Nguyên Phong Thông Bảo (中)	元豊通寳	1659–1685	Đức Xuyên (徳川)	Đức Xuyên Gia Cương (徳川 家綱)	None	
Hi Ninh Nguyên Bảo (中)	熈寧元寳	1659–1685	Đức Xuyên (徳川)	Đức Xuyên Gia Cương (徳川 家綱)	None	
Thiệu Thánh Nguyên Bảo (中)	紹聖元寳	1659–1685	Đức Xuyên (徳川)	Đức Xuyên Gia Cương (徳川 家綱)	None	
Gia Hựu Thông Bảo (中)	嘉祐通寳	1659–1685	Đức Xuyên (徳川)	Đức Xuyên Gia Cương (徳川 家綱)	None	
Vĩnh Trị Thông Bảo	永治通寶	1678–1680	Revival Lê (黎中興)	Lê Hi Tông (黎熙宗)		
Vĩnh Trị Nguyên Bảo	永治元寶	1678–1680	Revival Lê (黎中興)	Lê Hi Tông (黎熙宗)	None	
Vĩnh Trị Chí Bảo	永治至寶	1678–1680	Revival Lê (黎中興)	Lê Hi Tông (黎熙宗)	None	
Chính Hòa Thông Bảo	正和通寶	1680–1705	Revival Lê (黎中興)	Lê Hi Tông (黎熙宗)		
Chính Hòa Nguyên Bảo	正和元寶	1680–1705	Revival Lê (黎中興)	Lê Hi Tông (黎熙宗)	None	
Vĩnh Thịnh Thông Bảo	永聖通寶	1706–1719	Revival Lê (黎中興)	Lê Dụ Tông (黎裕宗)		
Bảo Thái Thông Bảo	保泰通寶	1720–1729	Revival Lê (黎中興)	Lê Dụ Tông (黎裕宗)		
Thiên Minh Thông Bảo	天明通寶	1738–1765	Nguyễn lords (阮主)	Nguyễn Phúc Khoát (阮福濶)		
Ninh Dân Thông Bảo	寧民通宝 (Note: The character "宝" is an abbreviated version of "寶" commonly found in Semi-cursive script. Note from Eduardo Toda y Güell's Annam and its minor currency where the coin was described of being "of doubtful origin" but has been identified since.)	1739–1741	None	Nguyễn Tuyển (阮選), Nguyễn Cừ (阮蘧), and Nguyễn Diên (阮筵) (Note: The leaders of the Ninh Xá rebellion Nguyễn Tuyển and Nguyễn Cừ were brothers while Nguyễn Diên was their nephew.)		
Cảnh Hưng Thông Bảo	景興通寶	1740–1786	Revival Lê (黎中興)	Lê Hiển Tông (黎顯宗)		
Cảnh Hưng Thông Bảo	景興通宝	1740–1786	Revival Lê (黎中興)	Lê Hiển Tông (黎顯宗)		
Cảnh Hưng Trung Bảo	景興中寶	1740–1786	Revival Lê (黎中興)	Lê Hiển Tông (黎顯宗)		
Cảnh Hưng Trung Bảo	景興中宝	1740–1786	Revival Lê (黎中興)	Lê Hiển Tông (黎顯宗)		
Cảnh Hưng Chí Bảo	景興至寶	1740–1786	Revival Lê (黎中興)	Lê Hiển Tông (黎顯宗)		
Cảnh Hưng Vĩnh Bảo	景興永寶	1740–1786	Revival Lê (黎中興)	Lê Hiển Tông (黎顯宗)		
Cảnh Hưng Đại Bảo	景興大寶	1740–1786	Revival Lê (黎中興)	Lê Hiển Tông (黎顯宗)		
Cảnh Hưng Thái Bảo	景興太寶	1740–1786	Revival Lê (黎中興)	Lê Hiển Tông (黎顯宗)		
Cảnh Hưng Cự Bảo	景興巨寶	1740–1786	Revival Lê (黎中興)	Lê Hiển Tông (黎顯宗)		
Cảnh Hưng Cự Bảo	景興巨宝	1740–1786	Revival Lê (黎中興)	Lê Hiển Tông (黎顯宗)		
Cảnh Hưng Trọng Bảo	景興重寶	1740–1786	Revival Lê (黎中興)	Lê Hiển Tông (黎顯宗)		
Cảnh Hưng Tuyền Bảo	景興泉寶	1740–1786	Revival Lê (黎中興)	Lê Hiển Tông (黎顯宗)		
Cảnh Hưng Thuận Bảo	景興順寶	1740–1786	Revival Lê (黎中興)	Lê Hiển Tông (黎顯宗)		
Cảnh Hưng Nội Bảo	景興內寶	1740–1786	Revival Lê (黎中興)	Lê Hiển Tông (黎顯宗)		
Cảnh Hưng Nội Bảo	景興內宝	1740–1786	Revival Lê (黎中興)	Lê Hiển Tông (黎顯宗)		
Cảnh Hưng Dụng Bảo	景興用寶	1740–1786	Revival Lê (黎中興)	Lê Hiển Tông (黎顯宗)		
Cảnh Hưng Dụng Bảo	景興踊寶	1740–1786	Revival Lê (黎中興)	Lê Hiển Tông (黎顯宗)	None	
Cảnh Hưng Lai Bảo	景興來寶	1740–1786	Revival Lê (黎中興)	Lê Hiển Tông (黎顯宗)	None	
Cảnh Hưng Thận Bảo	景興慎寶	1740–1786	Revival Lê (黎中興)	Lê Hiển Tông (黎顯宗)	None	
Cảnh Hưng Thọ Trường	景興壽長	1740–1786	Revival Lê (黎中興)	Lê Hiển Tông (黎顯宗)	None	
Cảnh Hưng Chính Bảo	景興正寶	1740–1786	Revival Lê (黎中興)	Lê Hiển Tông (黎顯宗)		
Cảnh Hưng Anh Bảo	景興英寶	1740–1786	Revival Lê (黎中興)	Lê Hiển Tông (黎顯宗)	None	
Cảnh Hưng Tống Bảo	景興宋寶	1740–1786	Revival Lê (黎中興)	Lê Hiển Tông (黎顯宗)		
Cảnh Hưng Thông Dụng	景興通用	1740–1786	Revival Lê (黎中興)	Lê Hiển Tông (黎顯宗)		
Cảnh Hưng Lợi Bảo	景興利寶	1740–1786	Revival Lê (黎中興)	Lê Hiển Tông (黎顯宗)	None	
Thái Đức Thông Bảo	泰德通寶	1778–1788	Tây Sơn (西山)	Thái Đức (泰德)		
Nam Vương Thông Bảo	南王通寶	1782–1786	Trịnh lords (鄭主)	Trịnh Khải (鄭楷)	None	
Nam Vương Cự Bảo	南王巨寶	1782–1786	Trịnh lords (鄭主)	Trịnh Khải (鄭楷)	None	
Minh Đức Thông Bảo	明德通寶	1787	Tây Sơn (西山)	Thái Đức (泰德)	None	
Chiêu Thống Thông Bảo	昭統通寶	1787–1789	Revival Lê (黎中興)	Lê Mẫn Đế (黎愍帝)		
Quang Trung Thông Bảo	光中通寶	1788–1792	Tây Sơn (西山)	Quang Trung (光中)		
Quang Trung Thông Bảo	光中通宝	1788–1792	Tây Sơn (西山)	Quang Trung (光中)		
Quang Trung Đại Bảo	光中大宝	1788–1792	Tây Sơn (西山)	Quang Trung (光中)		
Càn Long Thông Bảo; An Nam (Note: Cast as payments for Chinese soldiers stationed in Vietnam during the Battle of Ngọc Hồi-Đống Đa.) (中)	乾隆通寶 安南	1788–1789	Thanh (清)	Càn Long Emperor (乾隆帝)		
Gia Hưng Thông Bảo	嘉興通寶	1796–1802	Nguyễn lords (阮主)	Nguyễn Phúc Ánh (阮福暎)	None	
Cảnh Thịnh Thông Bảo	景盛通寶	1793–1801	Tây Sơn (西山)	Cảnh Thịnh (景盛)		
Cảnh Thịnh Đại Bảo	景盛大寶	1793–1801	Tây Sơn (西山)	Cảnh Thịnh (景盛)	None	
Bảo Hưng Thông Bảo	寶興通寶	1801–1802	Tây Sơn (西山)	Cảnh Thịnh (景盛)		
Gia Long Thông Bảo	嘉隆通寶	1802–1820	Nguyễn (阮)	Gia Long (嘉隆)		
Gia Long Cự Bảo	嘉隆巨寶	1802–1820	Nguyễn (阮)	Gia Long (嘉隆)	None	
Minh Mạng Thông Bảo	明命通寶	1820–1841	Nguyễn (阮)	Minh Mạng (明命)		
Trị Nguyên Thông Bảo	治元通寶	1831–1834	None	Lê Văn Khôi (黎文𠐤)		
Trị Bình Thông Bảo (中)	治平通寶	1831–1834	None	Lê Văn Khôi (黎文𠐤)		
Nguyên Long Thông Bảo	元隆通寶	1833–1835	None	Nông Văn Vân (農文雲)		
Thiệu Trị Thông Bảo	紹治通寶	1841–1847	Nguyễn (阮)	Thiệu Trị (紹治)		
Tự Đức Thông Bảo	嗣德通寶	1847–1883	Nguyễn (阮)	Tự Đức (嗣德)		
Tự Đức Bảo Sao	嗣德寶鈔	1861–1883	Nguyễn (阮)	Tự Đức (嗣德)		
Kiến Phúc Thông Bảo	建福通寶	1883–1884	Nguyễn (阮)	Kiến Phúc (建福)	None	
Hàm Nghi Thông Bảo	咸宜通寶	1884–1885	Nguyễn (阮)	Hàm Nghi (咸宜)	None	
Đồng Khánh Thông Bảo	同慶通寶	1885–1888	Nguyễn (阮)	Đồng Khánh (同慶)	None	
Thành Thái Thông Bảo	成泰通寶	1888–1907	Nguyễn (阮)	Thành Thái (成泰)	None	
Duy Tân Thông Bảo	維新通寶	1907–1916	Nguyễn (阮)	Duy Tân (維新)	None	
Khải Định Thông Bảo	啓定通寶	1916–1925	Nguyễn (阮)	Khải Định (啓定)	None	
Bảo Đại Thông Bảo	保大通寶	1926–1945 (Note: The production of these coins probably lasted into 1941 or 1942 because the occupying Japanese forces wanted the copper and were acquiring all of the cash coins they could find and stockpiling them in Haiphong for shipment to Japan for the production of war materials.)	Nguyễn (阮)	Bảo Đại (保大)	None	

=== Unidentified Vietnamese coins from 1600 and later ===
At various times many rebel leaders proclaimed themselves as lords (主), kings (王), and emperors (帝), and had produced their own coinage with their reign names and titles on them, but as their rebellions would prove unsuccessful or brief, their reigns and titles would go unrecorded in Vietnamese history. Therefore, coins produced by their rebellions cannot easily be classified. Coins were also often privately cast and these coins were sometimes of high quality or well-made imitations of imperial coinage, though often they would bear the same inscriptions as already circulating coinage and sometimes they would have "newly invented" inscriptions. The Nguyễn lords that ruled over Southern Vietnam had also produced their own coinage at various times as they were the de facto kings of the South, but as their rule was unofficial, it is currently unknown which coins can be attributed to which Nguyễn lord. Since Edouard Toda made his list in 1882, several of the coins that he had described as "originating from the Quảng Nam province" have been ascribed to the Nguyễn lords that the numismatists of his time could not identify. During the rule of the Nguyễn lords, many foundries for private mintage were also opened and many of these coins bear the same inscriptions as government-cast coinage or even bear newly invented inscriptions, making it hard to attribute these coins.

The following list contains Vietnamese cash coins whose origins cannot be (currently) established:

Inscription (chữ Quốc ngữ)	Inscription (chữ Hán)	Notes	Toda image	Image
Thiệu Thánh Nguyên Bảo	紹聖元寶			
Minh Định Tống Bảo	明定宋寶	"Tống Bảo" (宋寶) is written in Seal script.		
Cảnh Nguyên Thông Bảo	景元通寶	Appears in both Regular script, and Seal script.		
Thánh Tống Nguyên Bảo	聖宋元寶			
Càn Nguyên Thông Bảo	乾元通寶	Produced in the upper parts of Northern Vietnam.		
Phúc Bình Nguyên Bảo	福平元寶	Written in Seal script.		
Thiệt Quý Thông Bảo	邵癸通寶	Written in both Running hand and Seal script.		
Dương Nguyên Thông Bảo	洋元通寶	Appear in multiple sizes.		
Thiệu Phù Nguyên Bảo	紹符元寶	Written in Seal script.		
Nguyên Phù Thông Bảo	元符通寶	Written in Seal script.		
Đại Cung Thánh Bảo	大工聖寶			
Đại Hòa Thông Bảo	大和通寶	The reverse is rimless.		
Cảnh Thì Thông Bảo	景底通寶	The "底" closely resembles a "辰"		
Thiên Nguyên Thông Bảo	天元通寶	A variant exists where the "元" is written in Seal script.		
Nguyên Trị Thông Bảo	元治通寶	The characters "治" and "寶" are written in Seal script.		
Hoàng Hi Tống Bảo	皇熙宋寶			
Khai Thánh Nguyên Bảo	開聖元寶			
Thiệu Thánh Thông Bảo	紹聖通寶			
Thiệu Thánh Bình Bảo	紹聖平寶	the reverse is rimless.		
Thiệu Tống Nguyên Bảo	紹宋元寶			
Tường Tống Thông Bảo	祥宋通寶			
Tường Thánh Thông Bảo	祥聖通寶			
Hi Tống Nguyên Bảo	熙宋元寶			
Ứng Cảm Nguyên Bảo	應感元寶			
Thống Phù Nguyên Bảo	統符元寶			
Hi Thiệu Nguyên Bảo	熙紹元寶			
Chính Nguyên Thông Bảo	正元通寶	Variants exist with rimmed and rimless reverses, as well as one where there's a dot or a crescent on the reverse.		
Thiên Đức Nguyên Bảo	天德元寶			
Hoàng Ân Thông Bảo	皇恩通寶			
Thái Thánh Thông Bảo	太聖通寶			
Đại Thánh Thông Bảo	大聖通寶			
Chánh Hòa Thông Bảo	政和通寶	A variant exists where there's a crescent a dot on the reverse, and another one with only the crescent.		
Thánh Cung Tứ Bảo (Note: The coins from this part of the list and below are from Dr. R. Allan Barker (2004) while the coins above are from Edouard Toda (1882).)	聖宮慈寶		None	
Thánh Trần Thông Bảo	聖陳通寶		None	
Đại Định Thông Bảo	大定通寶		None	
Chính Long Nguyên Bảo	正隆元寶		None	
Hi Nguyên Thông Bảo	熙元通寶		None	
Cảnh Nguyên Thông Bảo	景元通寶		None	
Tống Nguyên Thông Bảo	宋元通寶		None	
Thiên Thánh Nguyên Bảo	天聖元寶		None	
Thánh Nguyên Thông Bảo	聖元通寶		None	
Chính Pháp Thông Bảo	正法通寶		None	
Tây Dương Phù Bảo	西洋符寶		None	
Tây Dương Bình Bảo	西洋平寶		None	
An Pháp Nguyên Bảo	安法元寶	Most often attributed to Lê Lợi (黎利).		
Bình Nam Thông Bảo	平南通寶	Often attributed to the Nguyễn lords (阮主).	None	

== Machine-struck cash coins made by the French government ==
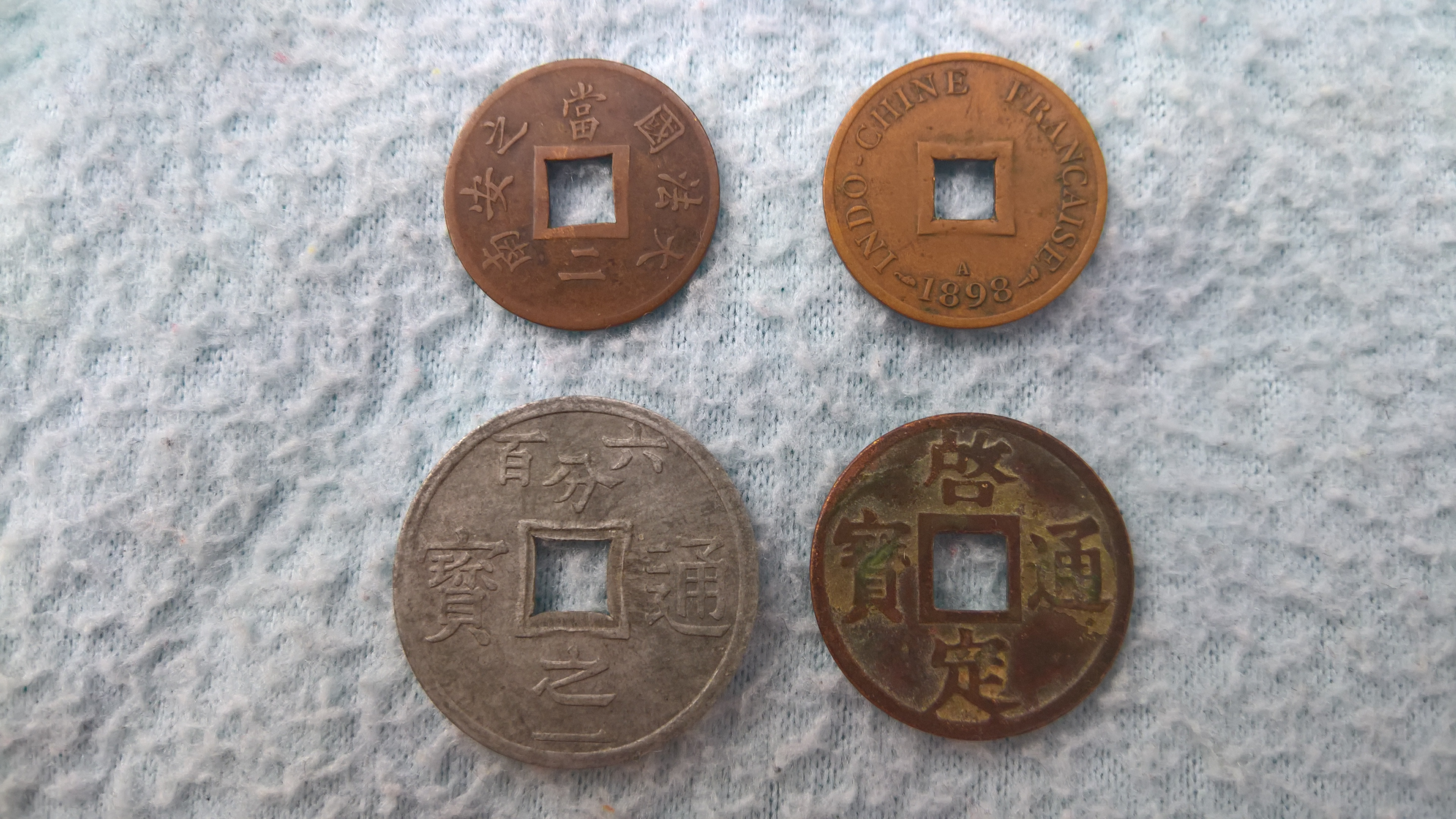
Various cash coins produced by the French government for circulation in Vietnam.

During the time that Vietnam was under French administration, the French started minting cash coins for circulation first for within the colony of Cochinchina and then for the other regions of Vietnam. These coins were minted in Paris and were all struck as opposed to the contemporary cast coinage that already circulated within Vietnam.

After the French had annexed Cochinchina from the Vietnamese, cash coins would continue to circulate in the region and depending on their weight and metal (as Vietnamese cash coins made from copper, tin, and zinc circulated simultaneously at the time at fluctuating rates) were accepted at six hundred to one thousand cash coins for a single Mexican or Spanish eight real coin or one piastre. In 1870 the North German company Dietrich Uhlhorn started privately minting machine-struck Tự Đức Thông Bảo (嗣德通寶) coins as the demand for cash coins in French Cochinchina was high. The coin weighed four grams which was close to the official weight of ten phần (3.7783 grams), which was the standard used by the imperial government at the time. Around 1875 the French introduced holed one-cent coins styled after the Vietnamese cash. In 1879 the French introduced the Cochinchinese Sapèque with a nominal value of 1/500 piastre, but the Vietnamese population at the time still preferred the old Tự Đức Thông Bảo coins despite their lower nominal value. The weight and size of the French Indochinese one-cent coin was reduced and the coin was holed in 1896 in order to appear more similar to cash coins. This was done to reflect the practice of stringing coins together and carrying them on a belt or pole because Oriental garments at the time did not have pockets. The French production of machine-struck cash coins was halted in 1902. As there were people in Hanoi and Saigon that did not want to give up on the production of machine-struck cash coins, a committee decided to strike zinc Sapèque coins with a nominal value of 1/600 piastre. These coins were produced at the Paris Mint and were dated 1905 despite being put into circulation only in 1906. These coins corroded and broke quite easily which made them unpopular and their production quickly ceased.

"Annamites are not content with the current state of affairs. They complain about the mode of the farms and monopolies, which obliges them to pay fees, paralyses the small trade and is an obstacle to much of trades of which a great part of the population live. The embarrassment is still increased by the progressive disappearance of the zinc currency, adapted so well to the condition of the needy Annamites. It still remains the base of all the small transactions. With two or three sapèques, the poor one can buy a fruit, a cake and thus calm the pains of the hunger. But, as the Government does not manufacture them any more, those which were in circulation become increasingly rare, and the market feels it, with the great detriment of all."

— The 1907 Annual Report by missionary Mgr. Gendreau of the Groupe des Mission du Tonkin.

After Khải Định became Emperor in 1916, Hanoi reduced the funds to cast Vietnamese cash coins, which had a dissatisfying effect on the Vietnamese market as the demand for cash coins remained high, so another committee was formed in Hanoi that ordered the creation of machine-struck copper-alloy Khải Định Thông Bảo (啓定通寶) cash coins to be minted in Haiphong. These coins weighed more than the old French Sapèques and were around 2.50 grams and were accepted at 1/500 piastre. There were 27 million Khải Định Thông Bảo of the first variant produced, while the second variant of the machine-struck Khải Định Thông Bảo had a mintage of 200 million. This was likely continued after the ascension of Emperor Bảo Đại in 1926, which was normal as previous Vietnamese emperors also kept producing cash coins with the inscription of their predecessors for a period of time. Emperor Bảo Đại had ordered the creation of cast Bảo Đại Thông Bảo (保大通寶) cash coins again which weighed 3.2 gram in 1933, while the French simultaneously began minting machine-struck coins with the same inscription that weighed 1.36 grams and were probably valued at 1/1000 piastre. There were two variants of this cash coin, where one had a large 大 (Đại) while the other had a smaller 大.

Denomination	Obverse inscription chữ Hán (chữ Quốc ngữ)	Reverse inscription	Metal	Years of mintage	Image
2 Sapèque (1/500 piastre)	當二 – 大法國之安南 (Đáng Nhị – Đại Pháp Quốc chi An Nam)	Cochinchine Française	copper	1879–1885	
2 Sapèque (1/500 piastre)	當二 – 大法國之安南 (Đáng Nhị – Đại Pháp Quốc chi An Nam)	Indo-Chine Française	copper	1887–1902	
1 Sapèque (1/600 piastre)	六百分之一 – 通寶 (Lục Bách Phân chi Nhất – Thông Bảo)	Protectorat du Tonkin	zinc	1905	
1 Sapèque (1/500 piastre)	啓定通寶 (Khải Định Thông Bảo)		Copper-alloy	1921–1925	
1 Sapèque (1/1000 piastre)	保大通寶 (Bảo Đại Thông Bảo)		Copper-alloy	1933–1945	

Gallery and notes
There were several efforts by French administration to produce machine-struck cash (sapèque):
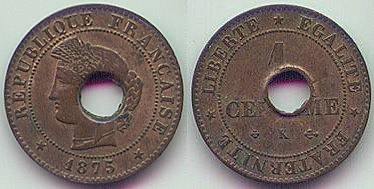
French Cochinchina
1/1000 Piastre 1878
copper

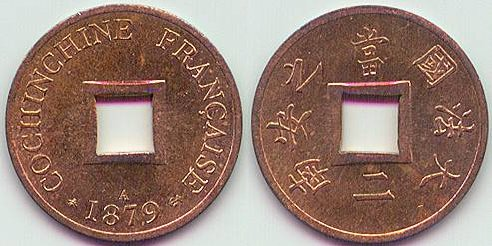
French Cochinchina
1/500 Piastre 1879
copper

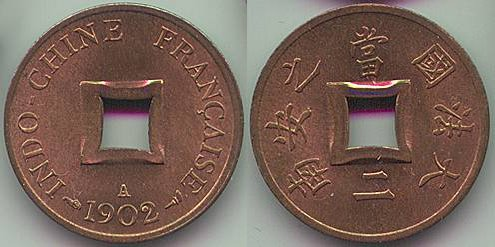
French Indochina
1/500 Piastre 1902
copper

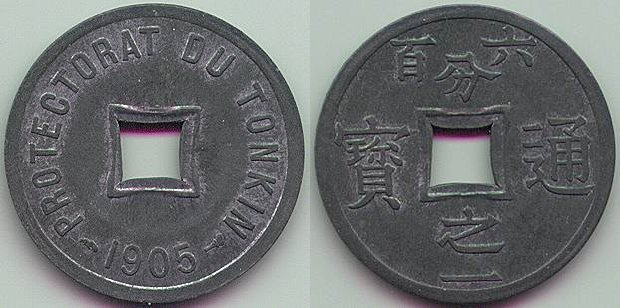
French protectorate of Tonkin
1/600 Piastre 1905
zinc

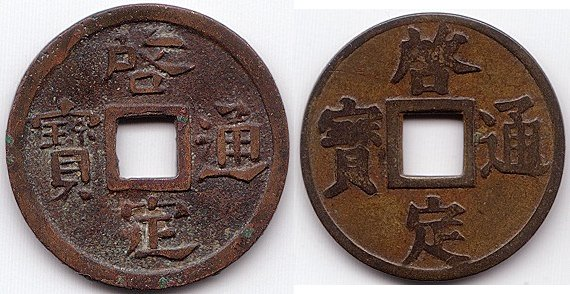
Khải Định Thông Bảo 啟定通寶 (1916–1925)
Cast (left) and Machine-struck (right) coins

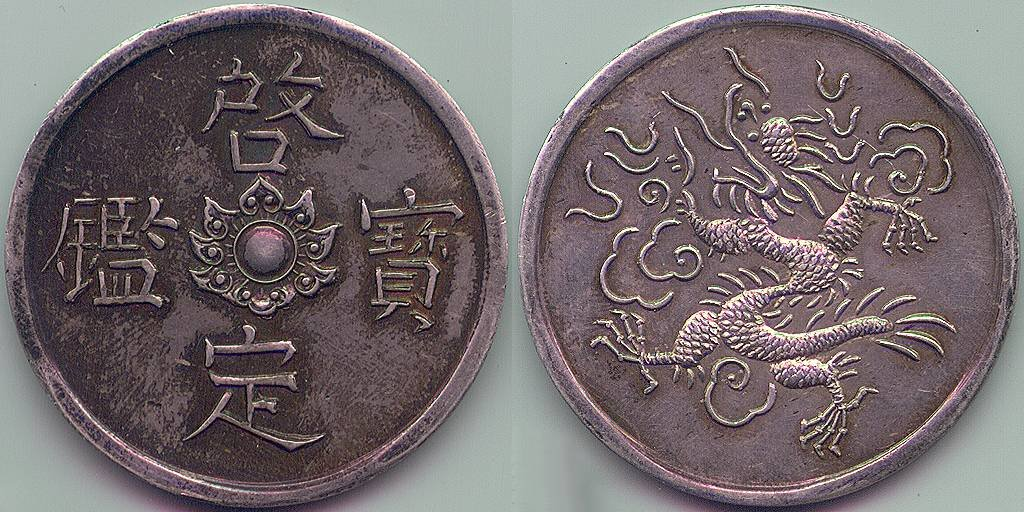
Flying dragon. Phi long (coin) of Khải Định

Emperors Khải Định (1916–1925) and Bảo Đại (1925–1945) produced both cast and machine-struck cash.

== Gold and silver cash coins ==
Gold and silver cash coins were not made in any other period of Vietnamese history until the Nguyễn dynasty, and during the Nguyễn their production was still very limited in number. But the emperors of the Nguyễn dynasty sought to expand the mintage of both gold and silver coins. According to the laws for casting coins in those metals, those used for paying mandarins are to be round in shape, and in ingots for payment to the troops in time of war.

The Nguyễn dynasty produced a large number of both gold and silver medals which had inscriptions and allegories relating to the Five Precious Things (五寶, ngũ bảo). These gold and silver medals were distributed by the emperor in return for services to the state. These medals, however, pass into circulation and are taken as currency according to their weight.

== Commemorative cash coins ==
=== Vạn Thọ Thông Bảo ===
During the 60th birthday of Revival Lê dynasty Emperor Lê Hiển Tông in 1774, a special Vạn Thọ Thông Bảo (萬夀通寶) amulet was cast; these charms were often used to commemorate the birthday of an emperor as had happened in the Qing dynasty with the 60th birthdays of Chinese emperors. The reason these charms are cast on this particular event is because sixty years symbolise a complete cycle of the ten heavenly stems and the twelve earthly branches.

=== Presentation coins and the Sapèque d'Honneur ===
Special cash coins were also produced in the form of decorations given by the government of the Nguyễn dynasty until 1945. Like in Imperial China, these coins came in the form of presentation coins (known in Vietnamese as Tiền), but after French colonisation these special cash coin awards known as Tiền were later also awarded as European-style medals called the Sapèque d'Honneur ('Cash coin of Honour').

These presentation coin decorations came in multiple classes and were known as Đồng Tiền (銅錢, 'Copper money'), Ngân Tiền (銀錢, 'Silver money'), and Kim Tiền (金錢, 'Gold money'). The Sapèque d'Honneur medal was further subdivided into the Sapèque d'Argent (made of silver) and the Sapèque d'Or (made of gold).

These decorations generally took the shape of silver or gold cash coins as well as other coinages issued by the Nguyễn dynasty, but would often have more elaborate designs and (often) different inscriptions.

== Recovery of cash coins in modern Vietnam ==
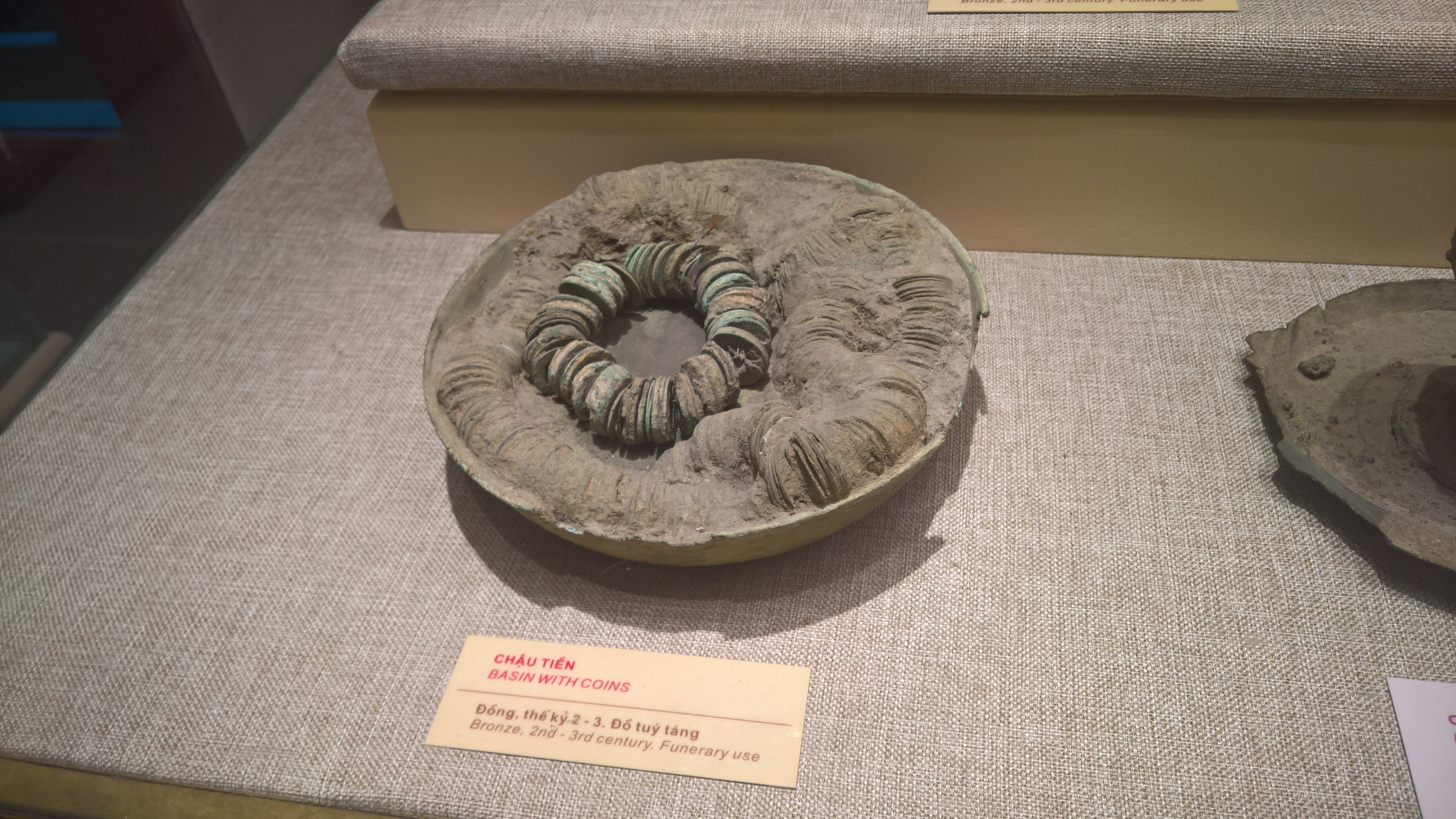
A lump of ancient Vietnamese cash coins in the National Museum of Vietnamese History, Hanoi.

In modern Vietnam the supply of undiscovered cash coins is rapidly declining as large amounts of Vietnamese cash coins were excavated during the 1980s and 1990s. In Vietnam the excavation of antiques such as cash coins is an industry in itself and cash coins are mostly dug up by farmers. After the Vietnam War ended in 1975, a large number of metal detectors numbering in the many thousands were left behind in the former area of South Vietnam, which helped fuel the rise of this industry. The antique bronze industry is mostly concentrated in small rural villages where farmers rent metal detectors to search their own lands for bronze antiques to then either sell as scrap or to dealers. These buyers purchase lumps of cash coins either by the kilogramme or ton and hire skilled people to search through these lumps of cash coins for sellable specimens. These coins are then sold to other dealers in Vietnam, China, and Japan. During the zenith of the coin recovery business in Vietnam, the number of bulk coins found on a monthly basis was fifteen tons. Only roughly fifteen kilogrammes of those coins were sellable and the rest of the coins would be melted down as scrap metal. As better metal detectors that could search deeper were introduced, more Vietnamese cash coins were discovered, but in modern times the supply of previously undiscovered Vietnamese cash coins is quickly diminishing.

In modern times many Vietnamese cash coins are found in sunken shipwrecks which are mandated by Vietnamese law to be the property of the Vietnamese government as salvaged ships of which the owner was unknown belong to the state.

Notable recent large finds of cash coins in Vietnam include 100 kilogrammes of Chinese cash coins and 35 kilogrammes of Vietnamese cash coins unearthed in the province of Quảng Trị in 2007, 52.9 kilogrammes of Chinese and Vietnamese cash coins unearthed in a cemetery in Haiphong in 2008, 50 kilogrammes of cash coins in the province of Hà Nam in 2015, and some Nagasaki trade coins in the province of Hà Tĩnh in 2018.

== See also ==
- Vietnamese dynasties
- Cash
- Chinese cash
- Japanese mon
- Korean mun
- Ryukyuan mon

== Sources ==
- ED. TODA. (1882) ANNAM and its minor currency. Hosted on Art-Hanoi. (Wikimedia Commons)
- Dr. R. Allan Barker. (2004) The historical Cash Coins of Viet Nam. ISBN 981-05-2300-9
- Howard A. Daniel, III – The Catalog and Guidebook of Southeast Asian Coins and Currency, Volume I, France (3rd Edition). Published: 10 April 2018. ISBN 1879951045.
- Pham Quoc Quan, Nguyen Dinh Chien, Nguyen Quoc Binh and Xiong Bao Kang: Tien Kim Loai Viet Nam. Vietnamese Coins. Bao Tang Lich Su Viet Nam. National Museum of Vietnamese History. Ha noi, 2005. (in Vietnamese)
- Hội khoa học lịch sử Thừa Thiên Huế, sách đã dẫn. (in Vietnamese)
- Trương Hữu Quýnh, Đinh Xuân Lâm, Lê Mậu Hãn, sách đã dẫn. (in Vietnamese)
- Lục Đức Thuận, Võ Quốc Ky (2009), Tiền cổ Việt Nam, Nhà xuất bản Giáo dục. (in Vietnamese)
- Đỗ Văn Ninh (1992), Tiền cổ Việt Nam, Nhà xuất bản Khoa học xã hội. (in Vietnamese)
- Trương Hữu Quýnh, Đinh Xuân Lâm, Lê Mậu Hãn chủ biên (2008), Đại cương lịch sử Việt Nam, Nhà xuất bản Giáo dục. (in Vietnamese)
- Viện Sử học (2007), Lịch sử Việt Nam, tập 4, Nhà xuất bản Khoa học xã hội. (in Vietnamese)
- Trần Trọng Kim (2010), Việt Nam sử lược, Nhà xuất bản Thời đại. (in Vietnamese)
- Catalogue des monnaies vietnamiennes (in French), François Thierry
- Yves Coativy, "Les monnaies vietnamiennes d'or et d'argent anépigraphes et à légendes (1820–1883)", Bulletin de la Société Française de Numismatique, février 2016, p. 57-62, (in French)
- Tien Kim Loai Viet Nam (Vietnamese Coins), Pham Quoc Quan, Hanoi, 2005. (in Vietnamese)
- W. Op den Velde, "Cash coin index. The Cash Coins of Vietnam", Amsterdam, 1996.

Preceded by: Chinese cash Reason: independence	Currency of Vietnam; 970 – 1948	Succeeded by: French Indochinese piastre, North Vietnamese đồng Reason: abolition of the monarchy
