= Nagasaki trade coins =

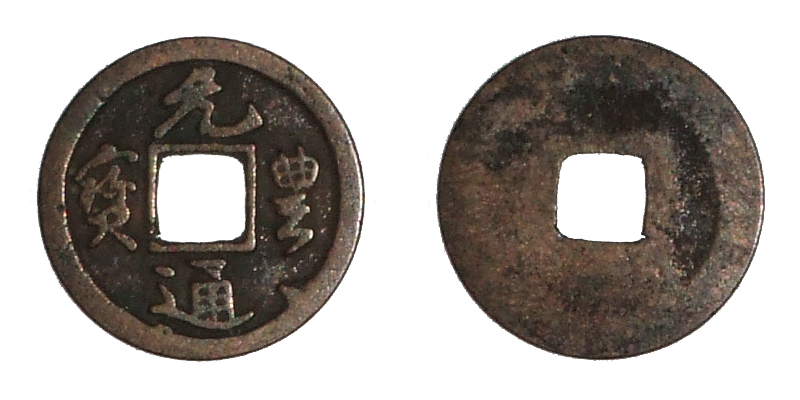
A Genpō Tsūhō (元豊通寳) coin, one of the Nagasaki trade coins.

Nagasaki trade coins (長崎貿易銭), also known as Nagasaki export coins, refer to Japanese mon coins specifically cast for export by the Tokugawa government between 1659 and 1685 during the Sakoku era. Though the inscriptions on the coins often match Chinese coins from the Song dynasty they’re often cast with different typefaces such as the fact that the Genpō Tsūhō (元豊通寳) produced at Nagasaki was in Clerical script while the Song dynasty’s versions were in Seal script and Running script. Due to the success of these coins they’re often still found in modern day Vietnam and Java, and were copied by contemporary Vietnamese mints as they had become the de facto standard coinage in Vietnam as native production had declined in the 17th century. As the export of gold and silver was banned by the Qing dynasty Japanese merchants were most likely to go to Hanoi and Hội An to gain access to Chinese products causing these coins to start circulating en masse on the Vietnamese market. A special “5 elements” series of Nagasaki trade coins were also cast for export to Taiwan.

== Background ==
Japanese trade with China started in the eight century with the Tang dynasty when Chinese merchants entered Japan, from the thirteenth century onwards Japanese merchants began to enter China and under the Yongle Emperor the Ming dynasty started issuing the Eiraku Tsūhō (永樂通寳) for export to other countries which included Japan, and these coins would circulate in Japan in lieu of Japanese coins until they started to mass produce the Kan’ei Tsūhō (寛永通寳) in 1626 for internal usage. The Japanese merchants exported Japanese imitations of the Eiraku Tsūhō, and locally produced Kan’ei Tsūhō coins to Đại Việt which became so popular there that they oftentimes became the main currency. This demand for Japanese coins would continue despite the Sakoku isolationist policies of the Tokugawa shogunate and even during the height of these export restrictions foreign trade still increased until the eighteenth century.

The Tokugawa government excluded the restrictions on foreign trade for certain domains such as Tsushima domain which gain a monopoly on trade with the Koreans in Pusan; Matsumae domain gained a monopoly on trade with the Ainu people on the island of Ezo (present at Hokkaido), and Satsuma domain maintained access to the Ryukyu Kingdom through its port of Kagoshima. While the Tokugawa shogunate itself opened up Nagasaki as the exclusive port for foreign trade with China, Southeast Asia, and the Dutch Republic through the Dutch East India Company due to the Japanese demand for silk and cloth.

Though the Japanese main export was silver to the Chinese as it was one of the world’s foremost producers of the metal, Japanese mines were also in demand for their vast quantities of copper which many southeast Asian national such as the contemporary Vietnamese lacked. Copper coins produced in Nagasaki were produced not only in enormous quantities but also in a huge variety, though these coins were produced using local Japanese mother coins they contained many Song dynasty inscriptions despite all being produced at a single mint and as contemporary Kan’ei Tsūhō coins were generally uniform Nagasaki trade coins can easily be distinguished.

== History ==
From 1608 the Tokugawa shogunate banned the circulation of “Bitasen” coins which were bad quality copies of Chinese coinage and instead opted to produce their own coinage, meanwhile contemporary Ming China largely phased out copper coins in favour of banknotes until in 1651 the Chinese requested the Japanese for copper coins which the Tokugawa shogunate started minting in Nagasaki.

=== Nagasaki trade coins in Vietnam ===
Ever since the early 17th century a large influx of Japanese merchants entered southern Vietnam through Hội An as the demand for silver and copper imported by the Nguyễn lords was high due to the lack of resources present in that region. Nguyễn Phúc Trăn requested several times to import a huge number copper coinage to Southern Vietnam as the Trịnh–Nguyễn War caused them to use a lot of copper for creating canons, the Nguyễn ran out of the resource. As Japanese merchants had been exporting banned low-quality “Bitasen” coins for high profits (as a string of cash coins would only get 1 tael of silver in Japan while it would get 10,5 in Vietnam) the export of copper coins proved to profitable to continue denying this request and finally in 1659 Nagasaki trade coins were cast for the Vietnamese and the Dutch East India Company (which also sold Nagasaki trade coins on the Vietnamese market, and exported them to Europe through the Netherlands).

In Northern Vietnam smaller Nagasaki trade coins were often melted down to make utensils with and circulated mostly only in Hanoi and the provinces surrounding it immediately, while the larger Nagasaki trade coins circulated throughout the entire country.

== List of Nagasaki trade coins ==
The following coins were minted in the city of Nagasaki for export:

Inscription (Kyūjitai)	Inscription (Shinjitai)	Font	Japanese (Romaji)	Mandarin (Hànyǔ Pīnyīn)	Vietnamese (chữ Quốc ngữ)	Image (Note: Click to enlarge)
元豊通寳	元豊通宝	Clerical script, Semi-cursive script, Seal script	Genpō Tsūhō	Yuán Fēng Tōng Bǎo	Nguyên Phong Thông Bảo	Nagasaki-genpotsuho-reisho
天聖元寳	天聖元宝	Regular script	Tensei Genpō	Tiān Shèng Yuán Bǎo	Thiên Thánh Nguyên Bảo	Nagasaki-tenseigenpo-reisho
祥符元寳	祥符元宝	Regular script	Shofu Genpō	Xiáng Fú Yuán Bǎo	Tường Phù Nguyên Bảo	Nagasaki-shohugenpo-reisho
嘉祐通寳	嘉祐通宝	Regular script	Kayū Tsūhō	Jiā Yòu Tōng Bǎo	Gia Hựu Thông Bảo	Nagasaki-kayutsuho-reisho
熈寧元寳	煕寧元宝	Regular script, Seal script	Kinei Genpō	Xī Níng Yuán Bǎo	Hi Ninh Nguyên Bảo	Nagasaki-kineigenpo-tensho
紹聖元寳	紹聖元宝	Seal script	Shōsei Genpō	Shào Shèng Yuán Bǎo	Thiệu Thánh Nguyên Bảo	Nagasaki-shoseigenpo-tensho
治平元寳	治平元宝	Seal script	Jihei Genpō	Zhì Píng Yuán Bǎo	Trị Bình Nguyên Bảo	

Nagasaki trade coins notably bear the inscription of many Song dynasty coins because those coins were already widespread in circulation on the Southeast Asian market making the Nagasaki trade coins more familiar for its target demographic.

== See also ==
- Vietnamese Văn

== Sources ==
- 滝沢武雄 『日本の貨幣の歴史』 吉川弘文館、1996年。 (in Japanese).
