= Piastres affair =

Financial-political scandal of the French Fourth Republic

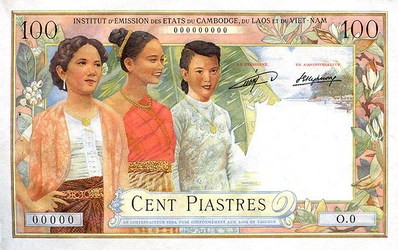
100 piastres, French Indochina circa 1954

The Piastres affair, also known as Piastres scandal or Piastres trade (French: l'affaire des piastres, le scandale des piastres, or le trafic de piastres), was a financial-political scandal of the French Fourth Republic during the First Indochina War from 1950 to 1953. It centered on the manipulation of the exchange rate between French Indochinese piastre to the French franc, which enabled widespread fraud at the expense of the French Treasury. The scandal weakened public support for the war in Indochina, although it quickly faded from political debate following the independence of the Indochinese states and the end of French colonial rule in the region.

== The Piastre Traffic (1948–1953) ==
The Indochinese piastre was the official currency of French Indochina and was issued under the authority of the Banque de l'Indochine. Its exchange rate against the French franc was fixed by the French government, in a manner comparable to the CFA franc and the CFP franc.

The basis for the affair was the pegging in 1945 of the French Indochinese piastre and the French franc at a rate of seventeen to one, increased from the previous rate of ten to one to avoid devaluation of the franc. However the real value of the piastre in Indochina remained around 10 francs or less; when piastres were transferred to France through the Foreign Exchange Office (Office indochinois des changes, or OIC) the Treasury (therefore the French taxpayer) paid out the established seventeen francs per piastre, amounting to an effective subsidy of around 8.50 francs according to Jacques Despuech, author of the first book on the case in 1953 and journalist for The French Nation. Despite controls given to the OIC in 1948, the situation resulted in widespread money-laundering related to organized crime and political corruption.

== Revelation and Resolution ==
The affair was brought to light in 1950 but aroused little interest among parliamentarians until 1952–3, when it was realized that the Viet Minh was also benefiting from the system to obtain funds for the purchase of weapons.

War correspondent François-Jean Armorin travelled to Indochina to investigate the affair and identified the Corsican crime figure Mathieu Franchini as a central figure in the trafficking network. Armorin disappeared at sea during the 1950 Air France Douglas DC-4 disaster while returning from Saigon to Paris. Following his death, the newspaper Franc-Tireur, for which he had been investigating the affair, published his unfinished work along with articles by the journalist Trèno of Le Canard enchaîné, alleging that Franchini had been responsible for the crash.

However, the official investigation found no material evidence supporting this claim and concluded that the accident had most likely resulted from pilot error during a landing attempt at Bahrain in adverse weather conditions. Henri Maux, Inspector General of Public Works and a government specialist on overseas affairs, also died in the same crash.

The proposed devaluation of the piastre also encountered opposition from members of the French Expeditionary Corps stationed in Indochina. French soldiers were able to accumulate savings by transferring funds back to France at the favorable official exchange rate, and many regarded this arrangement as an important financial benefit for themselves and their families. Successive French governments were therefore reluctant to alter the exchange rate out of concern that doing so would undermine troop morale.

Growing public controversy nevertheless compelled the French government to reduce the official exchange rate of the piastre from 17 francs to 10 francs on 10 May 1953. The devaluation substantially reduced the gap between the official and market exchange rates, thereby removing much of the speculative profit that had sustained the piastre traffic.

Historian Bernard B. Fall argued that the piastre traffic represented one of several mechanisms through which individuals profited from French colonial rule in Indochina, despite the colony's overall negative impact on the French national budget.

Military archives made accessible decades later, and discussed in a documentary by Fabien Béziat, indicate that, in addition to opportunists and the communist Viet Minh, organized crime networks and the Rally of the French People (RPF), the political movement founded by Charles de Gaulle, also benefited from clandestine funding linked to the affair.

In July, 1954 the Geneva Accords were signed, ending French Indochina.

== The Piastres Affair in Arts and Popular Culture ==
=== Film ===
• Mort en fraude (1957), directed by Marcel Camus.

=== Literature ===
==== Comics ====
Jean-Charles Kraehn and Patrick Jusseaume refer to the affair in the opening pages of The Treasure of Tonkin, Volume 9 of Tramp series, during a conversation between two characters.

==== Novels ====
- Mort en fraude (1953) by Jean Hougron depicts the piastre trafficking.
- Le Grand Monde (2022) by Pierre Lemaitre contains references to the affair.
- The affair is also mentioned in À tue... et à toi, a novel in the San-Antonio series by Frédéric Dard, first published in 1956.
- Mon assassin (2026) by Daniel Pennac also refers to the scandal.

==== Poetry ====
Deeply affected by the First Indochina War, Jacques Prévert alluded to the Piastre Affair in his poem "Prévert pose une question" ("Prévert Asks a Question"). The poem was first published in 1953 in Jean-Paul Sartre's collection on the Henri Martin Affair, and was later included in Prévert's poetry collection La pluie et le beau temps (1955). The poem contains the following lines:

"Against magnificent backdrops, the poor extras of death kept falling. Only those involved in the piastre traffic cried 'Encore!' and applauded."

== See also ==
- French Indochinese piastre
- Generals' Affair
- Henri Martin Affair
- First Indochina War
- French political scandals
- North Vietnamese đồng
