= List of political scandals in France =

This is a list of major political scandals in France.

== Until 1958 ==
- 1789: Réveillon riots - popular revolt from April 26- 28, in the Faubourg Saint-Antoine, Paris. Considered a precursor to the Storming of the Bastille and the French Revolution.
- 1797: XYZ Affair - a political and diplomatic episode involving confrontation with the United States that led to the Quasi-War.
- 1816: shipwreck of and search for the French frigate Méduse off the west coast of Africa
- 1847: Teste-Cubières corruption scandal, revealed in May 1847
- 1847: Charles de Choiseul-Praslin's suicide after having murdered his wife, daughter of Horace Sébastiani, minister of the July Monarchy
- 1880s: Georges Ernest Boulanger affair
- 1887: Schnaebele incident
- 1887: Wilson scandal, which led to the resignation of President Jules Grévy
- 1890s: Panama scandals
- 1894: Dreyfus affair, treason conviction of Alfred Dreyfus, exposed by writer Émile Zola on 13 January 1898
- 1904: the Affair of the Cards, sometimes called the Affair of the Casseroles.
- 1928: Marthe Hanau affair
- 1930: Albert Oustric affair
- 1934: Stavisky Affair, embezzlement and political corruption
- 1949: the Generals Affair, a political-military scandal during the First Indochina War
- 1950: the Henri Martin Affair, a political-military scandal during the First Indochina War
- 1958: the ballets roses, a scandal most notably involving then President of the Senate, André Le Troquer, in which a group of girls aged 15 to 17 performed "ballets" that ended in orgies

== Under the Fifth Republic ==
- 1965: the Ben Barka affair, disappearance of the Moroccan opposition leader Mehdi Ben Barka.
- 1968: The Markovic affair
- 1974:
  - Eurodif affair
  - Cardinal Jean Daniélou's death in the house of a prostitute
  - Le Monde reveals the existence of the SAFARI government database, prompting the creation of the CNIL agency in charge of respect of civil rights and data privacy.
- 1979:
  - Robert Boulin affair; a minister of the third Raymond Barre government, Boulin was found dead in mysterious circumstances on 30 October 1979
  - Diamonds Affair involving Bokassa
- 1981: the Canard enchaîné uncovered the collaborationist role of former official Maurice Papon under Vichy France; the latter would eventually be convicted of crimes against humanity
- 1985: sinking of the Rainbow Warrior by the French DGSE intelligence agency
- 1986: Chernobyl disaster, Jacques Chirac's government wrongly alleged that the "radioactive cloud" had stopped at the French borders
- 1987–1988: Iskandar Safa and the Hostage Scandal involving Prime Minister Jacques Chirac and Interior Minister Charles Pasqua
- 1980s: contaminated blood scandal
- The Canard enchaîné satirical newspaper fought to bring to light evidence of alleged corruption during President Jacques Chirac's tenure as Mayor of Paris.
- 1990s: Angolagate (arms-for-oil scandal)
  - La Fayette scandal
- 1994: Yann Piat affair; a former National Front MP, assassinated on 25 February 1994)
- 1994: Dauphiné News affair; Minister Alain Carignon indicted, later sentenced to 29 months in prison
- 1998: affair Elf-Dumas
- 1999: "Affair of the beach huts", leading to the arrest of prefect Bernard Bonnet
- 2005: the revelations of the Canard enchaîné on Finance Minister Hervé Gaymard's (UMP) lavish state-funded apartment led to his resignation in 2005
- 2006: Clearstream affair allegedly involving Prime Minister Dominique de Villepin (UMP) accused of attempting to discredit his political rivals, including UMP Leader Nicolas Sarkozy, by spreading false allegations concerning the Taiwan frigates scandal.
- Since 2010
  - Bettencourt affair
  - Karachi affair
  - Sylvie Andrieux affair
  - Alleged Libyan financing in the 2007 French presidential election
  - Cahuzac affair
  - 2012 UMP leadership election fraud accusations
  - Thomas Thevenoud affair
  - Kader Arif affair
  - Bruno Le Roux affair
  - Fillon affair
  - Benalla affair
  - Richard Ferrand affair

== See also ==
- Balladur jurisprudence, concerning ministers indicted by the justice
- Le Canard Enchaîné, an investigative satirical newspaper which uncovered many scandals
- Outreau affair, a judicial scandal
- Corruption in France
