= South Vietnamese đồng =

Former currency of South Vietnam

Vietnamese piastre
đồng Việt Nam Cộng Hòa (Vietnamese)
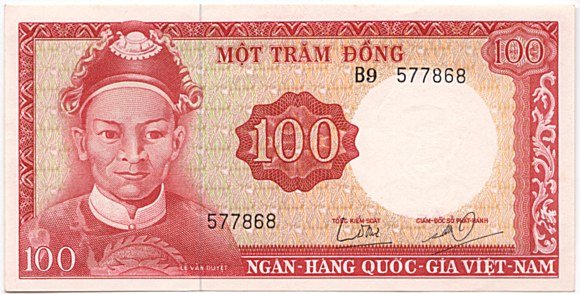
100 đồng 1966 front
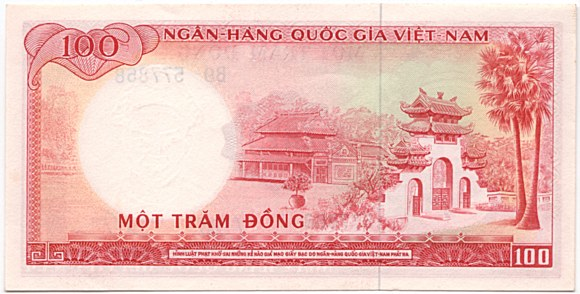
100 đồng 1966 back

Units of account
- Symbol: Đ, $,
- Subunit
- 1/100: xu or su

Denominations
- Banknotes: 1, 5, 10, 20, 50, 100, 200, 500, 1000 đồng
- Coins: 10, 20, 50 xu, 1, 5, 10, 20, 50 đồng

Demographics
- User(s): State of Vietnam; South Vietnam; Republic of South Vietnam (Liberation đồng); Vietnam (Liberation đồng, until 1978)

Issuance
- Central bank: National Bank of Vietnam
- This infobox shows the latest status before this currency was rendered obsolete.

The đồng, also called the piastre, was the currency of South Vietnam from 1953 to 2 May 1978. It was subdivided into 100 xu, also written su.

== First đồng, 1953 to 1975 ==
=== History ===
A South Vietnamese 1 đồng Coin from 1964

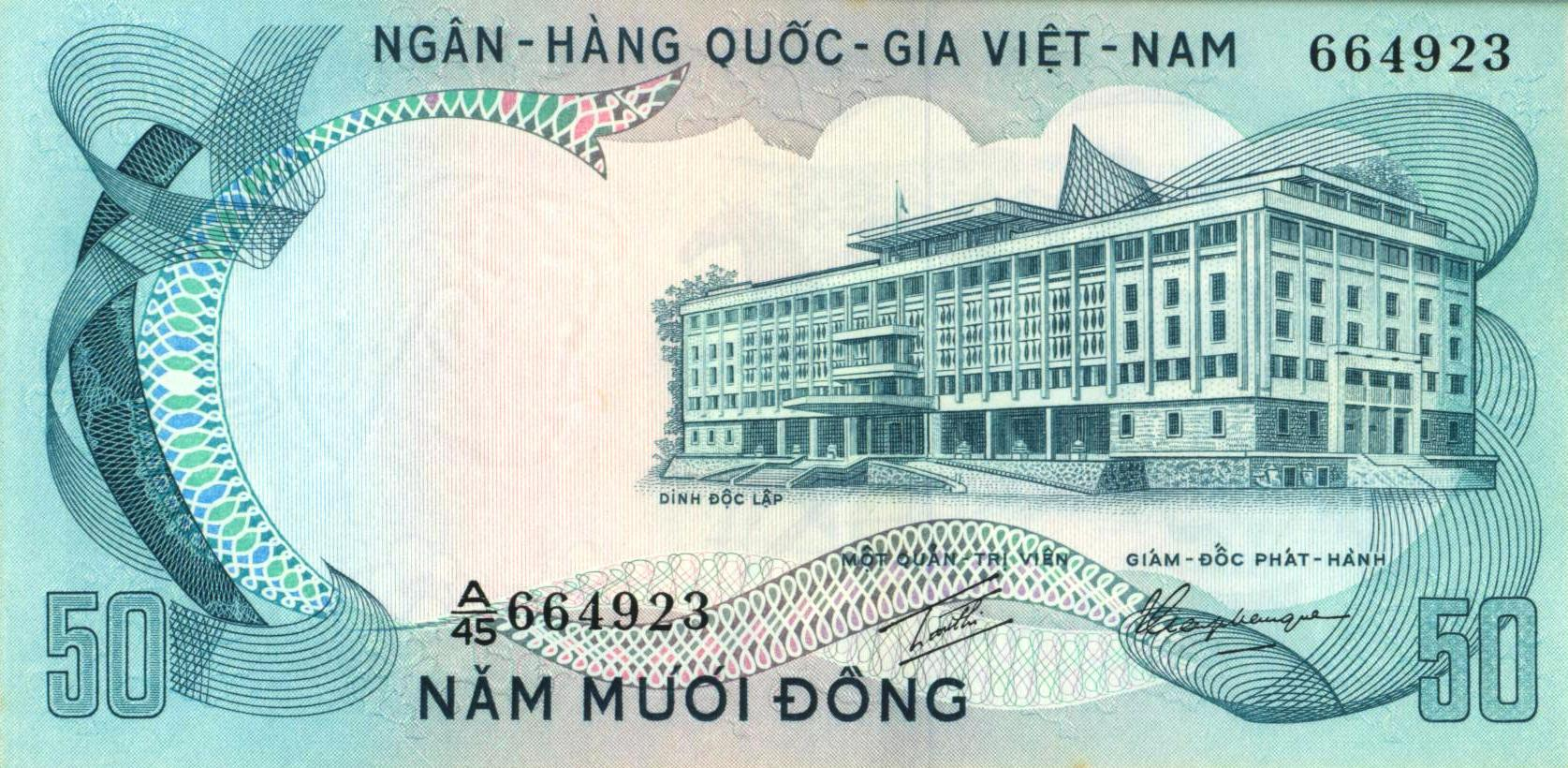
50 đồng banknote of the Republic of Vietnam issued in 1972.

In 1953, the Vietnam branch of the Institut d'Émission des États du Cambodge, du Laos et du Viet-nam issued notes dual denominated in piastre and đồng. At the same time, the two other branches of the Bank made similar issues with the riel in Cambodia and the kip in Laos. The đồng circulated in those parts of Vietnam not under the control of the Communist forces, which by 1954 coincided with South Vietnam. Coins denominated in su were also introduced in 1953. In 1955, an independent issue of đồng banknotes was produced by the National Bank of Vietnam.

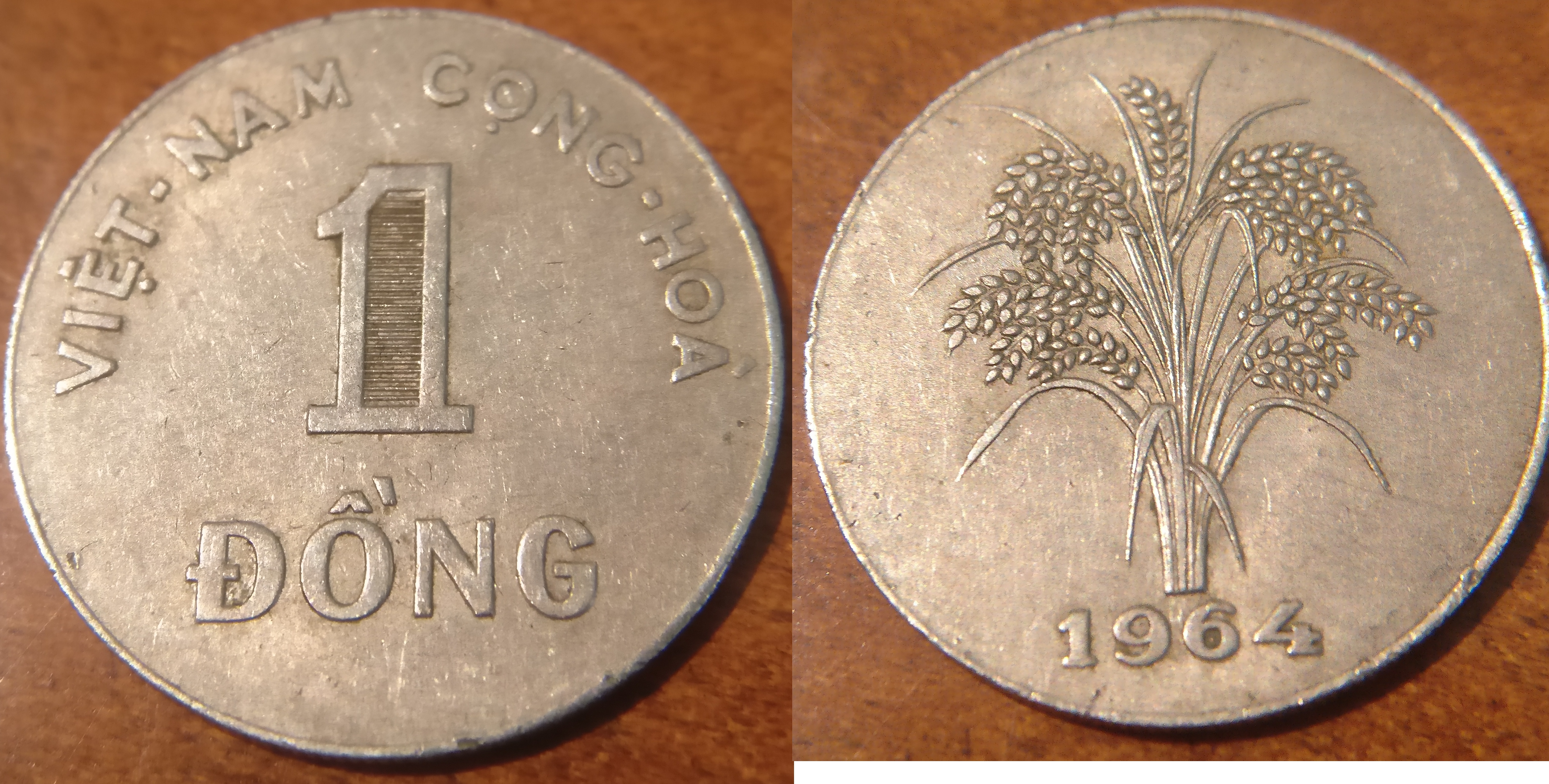
A Republic of Vietnam 1 đồng Coin from 1964

=== Coins ===
In 1953, 10, 20 and 50 su coins were introduced. In 1960, 1 đồng were added, followed by 10 đồng in 1964, 5 đồng in 1966 and 20 đồng in 1968. 50 đồng were minted dated 1975 but they were never shipped to Vietnam due to the fall of the South Vietnamese government. It is reported that all but a few examples were "disposed of as scrap metal" and the coin is very rare.

The coins issued can be roughly classified into five series:

First series
Obverse	Reverse	Value	Diameter	Composition	Obverse	Reverse	Minted Year
		10 su	23 mm	Aluminium	Three women, "Quốc gia Việt Nam" (State of Vietnam)	Rice plant, "Việt Nam"	1953
		20 su	27 mm	Aluminium	Three women, "Quốc gia Việt Nam" (State of Vietnam)	Rice plant, "Việt Nam"	1953
		50 xu	31 mm	Aluminium	Three women, "Quốc gia Việt Nam" (State of Vietnam)	Two dragons, "Việt Nam"	1953

Second series
Obverse	Reverse	Value	Diameter	Composition	Obverse	Reverse	Minted Year
		50 su	31 mm	Aluminium	Ngo Dinh Diem, "Việt Nam Cộng Hòa" (Republic of Vietnam)	Bamboo	1960
		1 đồng	23 mm	Cupronickel	Ngo Dinh Diem, "Việt Nam Cộng Hòa" (Republic of Vietnam)	Bamboo	1960

Third series
Obverse	Reverse	Value	Diameter	Composition	Obverse	Reverse	Minted Year
		50 xu	30 mm	Aluminium	Ngo Dinh Diem, "Việt Nam Cộng Hòa" (Republic of Vietnam)	Bamboo	1963
		1 đồng	23 mm	Cupronickel	"Việt Nam Cộng Hòa", value	Rice plant	1964
		5 đồng	25 mm (longest); Scalloped shape	Cupronickel	"Việt Nam Cộng Hòa", value	Rice plant, "Ngân Hàng Quốc gia Việt Nam" (National Bank of Vietnam)	1966
		10 đồng	26 mm	Cupronickel	"Việt Nam Cộng Hòa", value	Rice plant	1964

Fourth series
Obverse	Reverse	Value	Diameter	Composition	Obverse	Reverse	Minted Year
		1 đồng	23 mm	Nickel-plated steel	"Việt Nam Cộng Hòa", value	Rice plant	1971
		5 đồng	25 mm (longest); Scalloped shape	Nickel-plated steel	"Việt Nam Cộng Hòa", value	Rice plant, "Ngân Hàng Quốc gia Việt Nam" (National Bank of Vietnam)	1971
		10 đồng	26 mm	Nickel-plated steel	"Việt Nam Cộng Hòa", value	Rice plant	1968, 70
		20 đồng	30 mm (longest); Dodecagon	Nickel-plated steel	"Việt Nam Cộng Hòa", value	Farmer, "Ngân Hàng Quốc gia Việt Nam"	1968

Fifth (F.A.O.) series
Obverse	Reverse	Value	Diameter	Composition	Obverse	Reverse	Minted Year
		1 đồng	23 mm	Aluminium	"Việt Nam Cộng Hòa", value	Rice plant, Programme slogan	1971
		10 đồng	26 mm	Brass-plated steel	State title and bank title, value	Farmers, Programme slogan	1974
		20 đồng	30 mm (longest); Dodecagon	Nickel-plated steel	"Việt Nam Cộng Hòa", value	Farmer, Programme slogan	1968
		50 đồng	25 mm	Nickel-plated steel	State title and bank title, value	Farmers, Programme slogan	1975

=== Banknotes ===
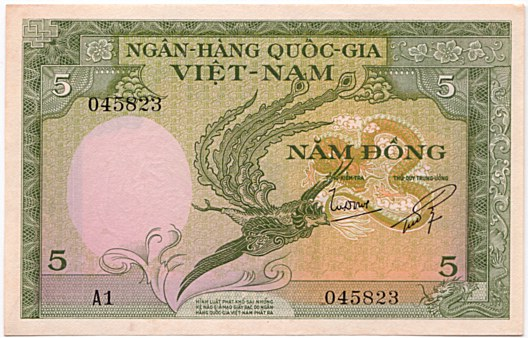
5 đồng banknote ofnthe Republic of Vietnam issued in 1966.

100 Đồng of the Republic of Vietnam issued in 1960

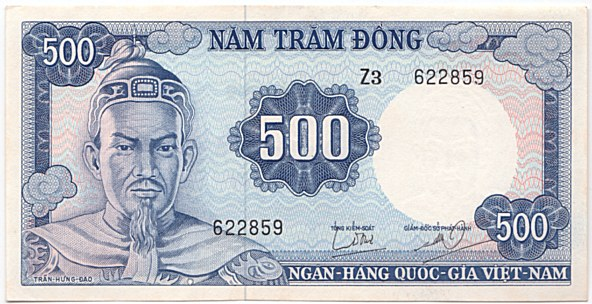
500 đồng banknote of the Republic of Vietnam issued in 1966.

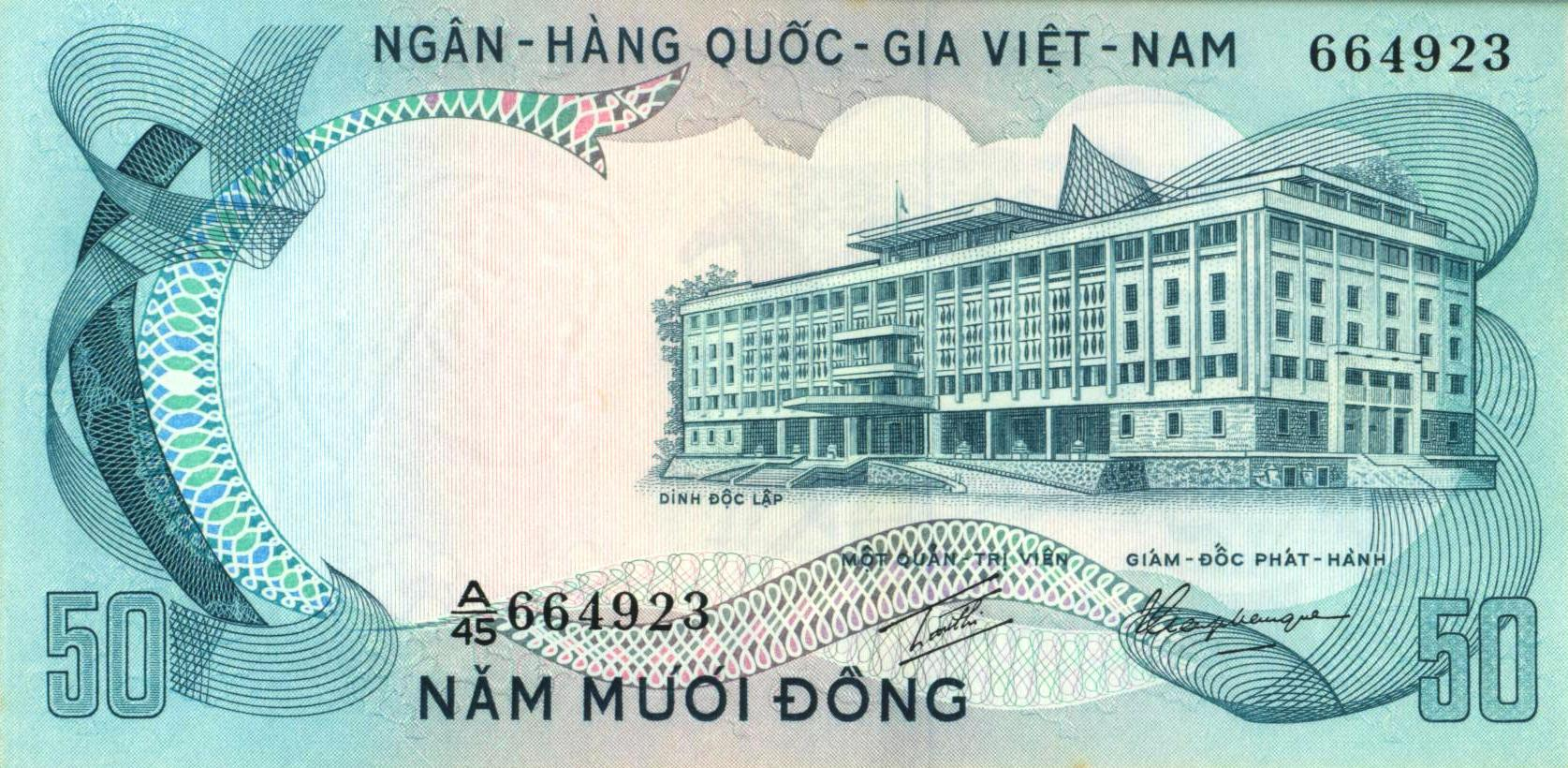
50 đồng banknote ofnthe Republic of Vietnam issued in 1972.

In 1953, notes (dated 1952) were introduced by the Institut d'Emission des Etats du Cambodge, du Laos et du Vietnam in denominations of 1, 5, 10, 100 and 200 đồng. On 22 September 1955, the Ministry of Finance and Economic Affairs announced that notes from the Bank of Indochina and the Institut d’Emission issues for Cambodia and Laos would be exchanged for Institut d’Emission issues for Vietnam starting 30 September until 7 November. The Institut issues for Cambodia and Laos ceased to be legal tender on 7 October, and all Bank of Indochina notes lost their legal tender status on 31 October following the 15 October introduction of the first notes from the National Bank of Vietnam. Subsequently, the Ngân-Hàng Quốc-Gia Việt-Nam (National Bank of Vietnam) took over the issuance of paper money, introducing 2 and 500 đồng notes in 1955 and 20 and 50 đồng in 1956. Between 1964 and 1968, notes below 50 đồng were replaced by coins. In 1971, 1000 đồng notes were introduced. Due to steady inflation, 5000 and 10000 đồng notes were printed in 1975 but not issued due to the fall of Saigon.

Because counterfeit banknotes were a major issue at the time, all South Vietnamese banknotes were printed with a warning stating that counterfeiters were to be punished by penal labour.

Dates	Denominations
1952–1953	1, 5, 10, 100, 200 đồng
1955–1958	1, 5, 10, 20, 100, 200, 500 đồng
1955–1962	1, 2, 5, 10, 20, 50, 200 đồng
1962–1966	1, 20, 50, 100, 500 đồng
1966	100, 200, 500 đồng
1969–1971	20, 50, 100, 200, 500, 1000 đồng
1972	50, 100, 200, 500, 1000 đồng
1975 (not issued)	1000, 5000, 10000 đồng

== Second đồng, 1975 to 1978 ==
Following the defeat of South Vietnam by North Vietnamese forces, the first đồng was replaced by a new currency, known as the "liberation đồng", at a rate of 1 liberation đồng = 500 first đồng on September 22, 1975. The liberation đồng circulated until May 2, 1978, when the two Vietnamese currencies merged and the liberation đồng was replaced by the new Vietnamese đồng at a rate of 1 new đồng = 0.8 liberation đồng.

=== Coins ===
Coins were issued in denominations of 1, 2 and 5 xu. All were holed coins struck in aluminium and were issued in the name of the Ngân-Hàng Việt-Nam (Bank of Vietnam). The 2 xu coin was dated 1975. The 1 and 5 xu were not dated but Krause & Mishler date them to 1976.

=== Banknotes ===
The Ngân-Hàng Việt-Nam (Bank of Vietnam) issued notes in denominations of 10, 20 and 50 xu, 1, 2, 5, 10 and 50 đồng. The notes were dated 1966.

== See also ==
- State of Vietnam
- Republic of Vietnam
- North Vietnamese đồng

South Vietnamese đồng
Preceded by: French Indochinese piastre Location: French Indochina; Reason: independence Ratio: at par Note: piastre not used in self-declared North Vietnam since 1946	Currency of South Vietnam; 1953 – 1975; Note: transitional notes dual denominated in piastre and đồng were used until 1955	Succeeded by: Liberation đồng Reason: capture of Saigon; Ratio: 1 liberation đồng = 500 South đồng

Liberation đồng
Preceded by: South Vietnamese đồng Reason: capture of Saigon; Ratio: 1 liberation đồng = 500 South đồng	Currency of South Vietnam; 1975 – 1978	Succeeded by: Vietnamese đồng Location: Vietnam; Reason: currency unification Ratio: 1 new đồng = 0.8 liberation đồng
