= Cochinchina piastre =

Official currency of Cochinchine francaise

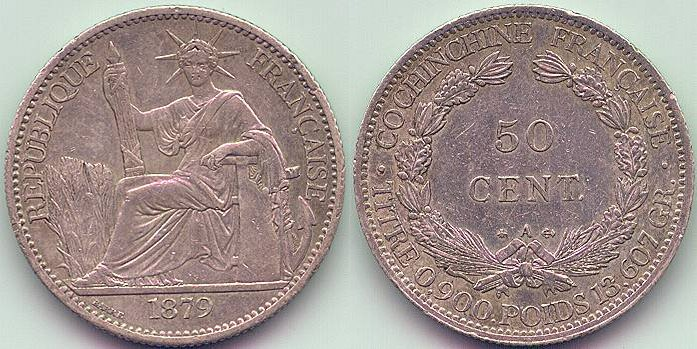
French Cochinchina 50 Cents 1879

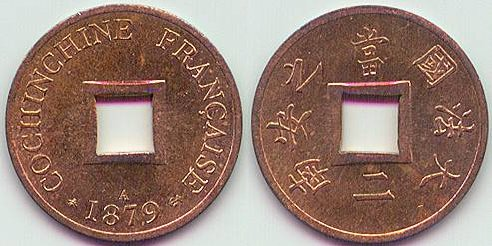
French Cochinchina 2 Sapèques 1879

Between 1878 and 1885, the Cochinchina piastre was the currency of the French colony of Cochinchina. It was replaced by the French Indochinese piastre after the creation of a unified administration for Cochinchina and the other French protectorates and colonies in the Far East (Annam, Cambodia and Tonkin) on 22 December 1885.

== History ==
=== Background ===
In the year 1868 the price for a lunch at a restaurant in rue Catinat in Saigon (present day Đồng Khởi Street in Ho Chi Minh City) cost one piastre while a dinner with wine cost 1 piastre and 25 cents.

The main currency of French Cochinchina (like that of Đại Nam) in the early colonial period was the Mexican peso, an average silver Mexican peso weighed 26.94 grams and at the time the exchange rate fluctuated between 5.37 and 6.30 French francs on the private marker, while the French government used 5.55 francs to 1 peso as the official exchange rate. Mexican pesos with Chinese chopmarks were also accepted at lower values in Saigon because of a large number of Chinese counterfeit pesos being produced. During this period Chinese merchants became more skilled in figuring out which Mexican pesos were fake while Chinese fakes also became less easy to be discovered. Other than Mexican pesos the population of French Cochinchina used silver sycees which usually had a value between 16 and 18 Mexican pesos (or between 80 and 100 French francs) a piece, these sycees were often rectangular in shape and only rarely diverging values, the production of these silver sycees was mostly in the hands of the government of the Nguyễn dynasty. During this era gold coins and sycees were extremely rare on the French Cochinchinese market.

The Comptoir national d'escompte de Paris (CNEP), which was already operating in some other French colonies, opened a branch in the city of Saigon in 1862. The accounting of the colony was kept in cents and French Francs but they had to accumulate and have Mexican pesos available for both local and foreign merchants. The governor of French Cochinchina issued a decree that all coins of 8 real (known to the French as the "piastre") would be accepted as having the weight of 24.24 of fine silver while every non-chopped silver peso weighed at least 24.50 grams. Vietnamese merchants quickly took this opportunity to purchase chopped Mexican pesos from China and independent Đại Nam and sold them to the French authorities for a profit. The French governor of Cochinchina was forced to rescind this decree and all coins went back to being traded at their actual weights.

The general exchange rate between silver French coins and Annamese sapèques was not favourable for the French as Cochinchinese money changers used an exchange rate of 8 tiền in sapèques per franc, which placed a disadvantage to the franc as a tiền was only worth 10 cents thus losing 20 cents per franc in the exchange. Meanwhile, the exchange rates for Mexican pesos to sapèques were rather favourable. On March 5, 1863, the silver French Francs and copper Centime coins were made legal tender for commercial transactions. Then the governor of Cochinchina officially valued the 5 Francs coins at 90% of a piastre, but its intrinsic value was actually 93%. Another decree that had to be rescinded.

During the colonial era in French Cochinchina Chinese sapèques (known as lý) were exclusively used as casino tokens by gambling houses and weren't used for other purchases unless trade was being conducted with Qing China. The general conversion rate was 1000 lý = 1 lạng = 7.50 French francs. The sapèques which circulated at the time of French Cochinchina were made from zinc and had a very distinctive square centre hole allowing for them to be strung into strings of 1000 zinc sapèques or 600 copper-alloy sapèques, these strings were known as quán tiền (貫錢) in Vietnamese and as ligatures or chapalets in French. Each string is further subdivided into 10 tiền consisting of 60 sapèques, these coins were valued in their quantity rather than in weight. These coins usually featured the reign or era title of the reigning Nguyễn monarch and were extremely poorly manufactured with bad alloys causing the strings to often break with many sapèques breaking resulting in considerable losses for their owners due to their brittleness. Charles Lemire described the heavy nature and difficult mobility of strings of sapèques as "a currency worthy of Lycurgus of Sparta" and non numerantur, sed ponderantur ("They are not counted but weighed"). Around the time that Charles Lemire entered Saigon around 1868 the presence of sapèques in circulation in Cochinchina has become less common but it was stated that the locals still preferred them over the European-style copper and silver currency introduced by the French. In rural areas of French Cochinchina sapèques were even more preferred over the piastre. The sapèque was especially beneficial for people who both earn and spend little money as sapèques could purchase items which were worth less than a cent, or even half, a quarter or a sixth of a cent due to their small denominations. The products described by Lemire which were of a value smaller than a cent in the year 1868 include an areca nut, betel leaves, tobacco, cigarettes, a single cup of tea, a single slice of pineapple, an orange fruit, a jackfruit, a fragment of sugar cane, a spoonful of fish sauce, or a palm leaf hat. These products were all purchasable with a small number of sapèques which is why these coins continued to be preferred in less wealthy areas. Because of the inconveniences associated with sapèques the European population of French Cochinchina found the introduction of the French franc to be essential for their daily payments and purchases.

The accounting of the Saigon branch of the Comptoir Nationale d’Escompte de Paris was kept in centimes and francs coins, but the organisation kept 4 real and 8 real coins available for merchants.

On 10 April 1862 a degree made the Spanish and Mexican real legal tender in French Cochinchina. The French governor in charge of Cochinchina decreed that a coin of 8 Reals, regardless of its weight, was to be valued at 24.24 grams of fine silver, when each non-chopmarked coin had at least 24.50 grams. Merchants used this as a loophole to trade in their chopmarked Mexican pesos for non-chopmarked ones at the French Treasury and made a huge profit off of it. Eventually the governor rescinded this degree and all silver coins were traded based on their weights and intrinsic value again rather than their nominal value.

On 5 March 1863, the colonial governor of French Cochinchina had made silver French francs and copper centime coins legal tender for commercial transactions within the territory. Then the French colonial governor had issued a degree which officially valued the 5 francs coins at 90% of a piastre, but its intrinsic value was actually 93% of a Piastre, which allowed for abuse by merchants, which made this another decree that had to be rescinded.

Eventually the French government released the unpunched 1 centime coins into circulation in French Cochinchina alongside other metropolitan French coins such as the centimes and francs. However, these coins all saw very little circulation among the local Vietnamese people, the metropolitan French coins were mostly used by the European population of French Cochinchina, while the Vietnamese merchants preferred Spanish dollars and Mexican reals in order to conduct trade in East Asia where these coins were the norm.

=== Economics ===
Up to 1878, French colonies used the French franc, which was then on the gold standard. The monetary policies of Cochinchina, however, had to balance the needs of trade with France and other Europeans against the needs of trade in Asia, where the silver standard predominated. To this end France introduced the piastre in Cochinchina, which was based on the silver standard and was not tied to the French franc. This set Cochinchina, and after 1885 other French colonies in Indo-China, apart from French colonies in Africa and the Pacific, which did not have currencies independent of the French franc until the CFA franc and the CFP franc were introduced after the Second World War.

=== Acceptance by the local population ===
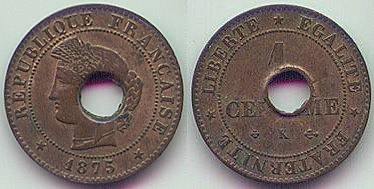
First coin of French Cochinchina (1878)

In 1878 1,000,000 French 1 centime coins were brought to the Saigon arsenal and were to be made into sapèques by having them holed and be worth 1/1000 piastre, however the local population rejected these coins. The Vietnamese zinc and copper alloy cash coins continued to be the primary circulating coins for the Cochinchinese people, which were just right for a population who were generally extremely poor. Their need for coins was only a minor part of their lives and barter was much more common in the region at the time. And all cash coins that did circulate were bartered according to their current intrinsic values. After the unpunched 1 centime and other French franc coins were introduced they would see little circulation with the local population, while the merchants still preferred the Mexican peso for their trade.

The governor of French Cochinchina established a study group to design coins which would be accepted by the local population on December 24, 1878, by decree. This study group submitted designs, denominations, metals and weights of the sapèque, 1 cent, 10 cents, 20 cents, 50 cents, and piastre coins with the text "Cochinchine Française" on them, these designs were officially accepted by decrees issued on April 7 & 22, 1879 by the governor. All coins except for the 1 piastre coin were introduced, the piastre would only be introduced as part of the French Indochinese piastre later and Spanish and Mexican silver coins served as the piastres in Cochinchina. The "second" French-made sapèque of this series saw considerable more circulation than the "first" French-made sapèque, but was still largely disliked by the local populace who preferred the cast cash coins issued by the Nguyễn dynasty.

== Coins ==
1878: Copper Sapèque (1/1000 Piastre) Bordeaux Mint, holed in Saigon arsenal.

1879: Copper Sapèque (1/500 Piastre), 1 Cent; Silver 10 Cents, 20 Cents, 50 Cents, 1 Piastre (Essai) Paris Mint

1884: Copper 1 Cent; Silver 10 Cents, 20 Cents, 50 Cents. Paris Mint

1885: All denominations were minted in PROOF quality in limited quantity.

The sapèque was the French colonial version of the cash, like the Chinese cash, which the French allowed the local Nguyễn emperors to continue imitating, it has a square hole and only inscriptions for its types. Now, the inscriptions are in both French and Vietnamese (written with Chinese characters) and the coins are struck not cast. Larger copper centimes and the silver coins of French Cochinchina all showed a seated personification of the Republic from the Great Seal of France. As in the seal, she has her left arm on a rudder and a fasces in her right hand, but now an anchor is placed behind the rudder and there are rice plants in the background. Jacques-Jean Barre engraved the seal and his son A. Barre designed this coin. His name, BARRE, appears below the personification's foot. The A mint mark of Monnaie de Paris appears on these coins along with the marks of its master and chief engraver, which changed between the beginning and end of the issue.

Coins of the Cochinchina piastre
| Denomination | Obverse | Reverse | Obverse | Reverse | Composition |
|---|---|---|---|---|---|
| 1 Sapèque (1/1000 piastre) | | | Republique Française; Marianne; date | Liberté * Égalité * Fraternité; denomination | Copper |
| 2 Sapèque (1/500 piastre) | | | Cochinchine Française; date | 大法國之安南; 當二 | Copper |
| 1 cent | | | Republique Française; Lady Liberty; date | Cochinchine Française; 百分之一; Poids 10 Gr; denomination | Copper |
| 10 cents | | | Republique Française; Lady Liberty; date | Cochinchine Française; Titre 0,900. Poids 2,721; denomination | Silver (.900) |
| 20 cents | | | Republique Française; Lady Liberty; date | Cochinchine Française; Titre 0,900. Poids 5,443; denomination | Silver (.900) |
| 50 cents | | | Republique Française; Lady Liberty; date | Cochinchine Française; Titre 0,900. Poids 13,607; denomination | Silver (.900) |

== Banknotes ==
The banknotes of 5, 20 and 100 Dollars/Piastres, issued by the Banque de l'Indochine and similar in design to later French Indochina notes, are currently extremely rare.

The French Treasury in Saigon, and later in the protectorates, issued "checks" denominated in 50, 100, 500, 1000, and 1500 French francs in an attempt to greatly improve trade between French Cochinchina and Metropolitan France. And until the year 1879, the French merchants brought in metropolitan French franc coins and banknotes for use in the colony of Cochinchina so the "checks" denominated in Francs were very useful to them. The governor's decree of January 25, 1875 authorized the establishment of a privately capitalised bank which would hold a monopoly of issuing banknotes for the colony. The largest shareholder of this bank was the Comptoir National d’Escompte, which was also the first French bank to have a branch in the city Saigon. This newly established bank was named by far-sighted individual as the Banque De l’Indo-Chine (Bank of Indo-China).

The first series of notes issued by the Banque de l’Indo-Chine had denominations in 5, 20 and 100 dollars/piastres and were issued in late 1875. These banknotes show that the French had finally accepted the fact that the Mexican 8 real coins (referred to as "dollar" in English and "piastre" in French) were the dominant trade coins in Cochinchina, which was made official in 1878. The faces are in French and the backs are in Vietnamese written in chữ Hán. The earliest Hải Phòng notes were only legal tender in the protectorates of Tonkin and Laos, while the Saigon notes were accepted in the colony of Cochinchina and the protectorates of Annam and Cambodia. Eventually these banknotes were accepted throughout French Indochina.

== Sources ==
- Howard A. Daniel, III (2018) [1978]. The Catalog and Guidebook of Southeast Asian Coins and Currency. Vol. I: France. Southeast Asian Treasury. ISBN 978-1-87995-104-4.
- Jean Lecompte (2000) Monnaies et Jetons des Colonies Françaises. ISBN 2-906602-16-7

| Preceded by: Mexican dollar, Vietnamese cash Reason: decree of January 21, 1875 chartering Banque de l'Indochine | Currency of French Cochincnina; 1878 – 1885 | Succeeded by: French Indochina Piastre; Reason: creation of French Indochina; Ratio: at par |
