= K- =

K- or k- may refer to:

- K−, insensitivity to the K spot test
- K^{−}, a negatively charged kaon
- K-, a prefix meaning the Korean Wave such as K-pop, K-drama

== See also ==
- List of state highways in Kansas
- ₭, the currency sign for the Lao kip
