= Vietnamese đồng =

Currency of Vietnam

Đồng
ISO 4217
- Code: VND (numeric: 704); 1989–1990: VNC

Units of account
- Plural: The language(s) of this currency do(es) not have a morphological plural distinction.
- Symbol: ₫
- Subunit
- 1/10: hào
- 1/100: xu

Denominations
- Banknotes
- Freq. used: 1,000₫, 2,000₫, 5,000₫, 10,000₫, 20,000₫, 50,000₫, 100,000₫, 200,000₫, 500,000₫
- Rarely used: 50₫ (commemorative), 100₫ (commemorative), 100₫, 200₫, 500₫, 500,000₫ (commemorative)

Demographics
- User(s): Vietnam

Issuance
- Central bank: State Bank of Vietnam
- Website: www.sbv.gov.vn

Valuation
- Inflation: ▼2.7% (2019)

The dong (/dɒŋ/; Vietnamese: đồng, pronounced [ˀɗɜwŋ͡m˨˩]; sign: ₫, informally đ or Đ; code: VND) is the currency of Vietnam, in use since 3 May 1978. It is issued by the State Bank of Vietnam. The dong was also the currency of the predecessor states of North Vietnam and South Vietnam, having replaced the previously used French Indochinese piastre.

Formerly, it was subdivided into 10 hao (hào), which were further subdivided into 10 xu, neither of which are now used due to inflation. Since 2003, Vietnam has replaced cotton banknotes with polymer (plastic) for denominations of 10,000₫ and above to increase durability and security. The Vietnamese dong has recently switched to exclusively using banknotes and moving towards digital payments, with lower denominations printed on paper and denominations over 10,000 dong, worth about 40¢ dollar or euro, printed on polymer. As of 2022, no coins are used. The 500,000-dong note (VND) is the highest-denomination banknote in circulation in Vietnam. The note is dark blue in color and has been in circulation since 2003.

As of 28 February 2026, the Vietnamese dong is the third-lowest valued currency unit (behind the Iranian rial and the Lebanese pound), with one United States dollar equaling 26,045 dong.

== Etymology ==
The word đồng is the Sino-Vietnamese word for copper. (Chữ Hán: 銅)

== History ==
=== French Indochina ===
The piastre (known in Vietnam as "silver") was the currency of French Indochina between 1885 and 1952.

=== North Vietnam ===
In 1946, the Viet Minh government (later to become the government of North Vietnam) introduced its own currency, the dong, to replace the French Indochinese piastre at par. Two revaluations followed, in 1951 and 1959; the first was at a rate of 100:1, the second at a rate of 1,000:1.

=== South Vietnam ===
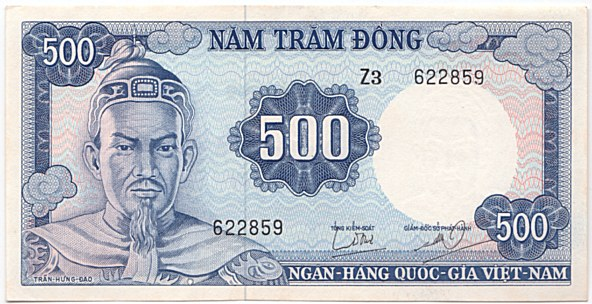
South Vietnam 500-dong banknote issued in 1966

Notes dually denominated in piastres and dong were issued in 1953 for the State of Vietnam, which evolved into South Vietnam in 1954. On 22 September 1975, after the fall of Saigon, the currency in South Vietnam was changed to a "liberation dong" worth 500 old Southern dong.

=== United Vietnam and inflation ===
After Vietnam was reunified, the dong was also unified on 3 May 1978. One new dong equalled one Northern dong or 0.8 Southern "liberation" dong.

On 14 September 1985, the dong was revalued again, with one new dong worth 10 old dong. At that time, Vietnamese economists believed that revaluing the currency would increase its value, but it turned out to have the opposite effect: savings of many people were wiped out, the currency experienced unprecedentedly heavy inflation that peaked at 700% in September 1986 and prices skyrocketed. For example, in 1986, the price of agricultural products increased by 2000% compared to ten years before. Aiming to solve this problem, the government banned all forms of non-state-owned internal trade, which they believed to be capitalistic, resulting in an economic crisis so severe that Tố Hữu referred to it as a "vertical downturn". Despite the inflation rates having stabilized as part of the Đổi Mới reforms, especially during the 1990s and early 2000s, the effects of the crisis still last in the value of the dong, one of the lowest in the world today.

== Coins ==
=== First dong ===
In 1978, aluminum coins dated 1976 were introduced in denominations of 1, 2 and 5 hao, as well as 1 dong. The coins were minted by the Berlin Mint in the German Democratic Republic and bear the state crest on the obverse and denomination on the reverse. Due to the chronic inflation experienced by Vietnam during the 1980s and 1990s, these coins lost all their relevant value and no coins were circulated for many years after this series.

1976 Series
Image	Value	Technical parameters				Description			Date of			
Image	Value	Diameter	Thickness	Mass	Composition	Edge	Obverse	Reverse	First Minting	Issue	Issue Suspended	Withdrawal
	1 hao	Unknown			Aluminum	Reeded	Coat of arms	Denomination	1976	2 May 1978	14 September 1985	
	2 hao	Unknown			Aluminum	Reeded	Coat of arms	Denomination	1976	2 May 1978	14 September 1985	
	5 hao	Unknown			Aluminum	Reeded	Coat of arms	Denomination	1976	2 May 1978	14 September 1985	
	1 dong	Unknown			Aluminum	Reeded	Coat of arms	Denomination	1976	2 May 1978	14 September 1985	
These images are to scale at 2.5 pixels per millimetre. For table standards, see the coin specification table.

=== Second dong ===
==== Commemorative issues ====
Commemorative coins in copper, brass, copper-nickel, silver, and gold have been issued since 1986, but none of these have ever been used in circulation.

==== 2003 issue ====
The State Bank of Vietnam resumed issuing coins on 17 December 2003. The new coins, minted by the Mint of Finland, were in denominations of 200, 500, 1,000, 2,000, and 5,000 dong in either nickel-clad steel or brass-clad steel. Prior to its reintroduction, Vietnamese consumers had to exchange banknotes for tokens with a clerk before purchasing goods from vending machines. This was also to help the state ease the cost of producing large quantities of small denomination banknotes, which tended to wear easily. Many residents expressed excitement at seeing coins reappear after many years, as well as concern for the limited usefulness of the 200 dong coins due to ongoing inflationary pressures.

Following the launch of the 2003 coin series, the State Bank had difficulties with making the acceptance of coins universal despite the partial discontinuation of smaller notes, to the point of some banks refusing coin cash deposits or the cashing in of large numbers of coins. This prompted laws requiring private and municipal banks to transact and offer services for coins and the full discontinuation of small denomination and cotton-based notes. However, coins did not gain acceptance from the Vietnamese people. Eventually, the State Bank of Vietnam withdrew coins from distribution in April 2011.

2003 Series
Image	Value	Technical Parameters				Description			Date of			
Image	Value	Diameter	Thickness	Mass	Composition	Edge	Obverse	Reverse	First Minting	Issue	Issue Suspended	Withdrawal
	200 dong	20 mm	1.45 mm	3.2 g	Nickel-plated steel	Plain	Coat of arms	Denomination	2003	17 December 2003	April 2011	Very rare, partly withdrawn out of circulation
	500 dong	22 mm	1.75 mm	4.5 g	Nickel-plated steel	Segmented (3 groups)	Coat of arms	Denomination	2003	1 April 2004	April 2011	Very rare, partly withdrawn out of circulation
	1,000 dong	19 mm	1.95 mm	3.8 g	Brass-plated steel	Reeded	Coat of arms	Water Temple, Đô Temple	2003	17 December 2003	April 2011	Very rare, partly withdrawn out of circulation
	2,000 dong	23.5 mm	1.8 mm	5.1 g	Brass-plated steel	Segmented (6 groups)	Coat of arms	Highland Stilt house in Tay Nguyen	2003	1 April 2004	April 2011	Very rare, partly withdrawn out of circulation
	5,000 dong	25.5 mm	2.2 mm	7.7 g	Brass (Cu_{92}Al_{6}Ni_{2})	Micro-scalloped	Coat of arms	Một Cột Pagoda (One Pillar Pagoda)	2003	17 December 2003	April 2011	Very rare, partly withdrawn out of circulation
These images are to scale at 2.5 pixels per millimetre. For table standards, see the coin specification table.

== Banknotes ==
=== First dong ===
In 1978, the State Bank of Vietnam (Ngân hàng Nhà nước Việt Nam) introduced notes in denominations of 5 hao, 1, 5, 10, 20, and 50 dong dated 1976. In 1980, 2 and 10 dong notes were added, followed by 30 and 100 dong notes in 1981. These notes were discontinued in 1985 as they gradually lost value due to inflation and economic instability.

First dong (1978–1981)
Image	Value	Dimensions	Main Color	Description		Date of			
Image	Value	Dimensions	Main Color	Obverse	Reverse	Printing	Issue	Issue Suspended	Withdrawal
	5 hao	107 × 53 mm	Purple-Brown	Coat of Arms	Coconut palm	1976	2 May 1978	14 September 1985	
	1 dong	115 × 57 mm	Brown	Coat of Arms	Thai Nguyen Iron and Steel Corporation	1976	2 May 1978	14 September 1985	
	2 dong	115 × 58 mm	Purple	Coat of Arms	River Scene	1980	1980	14 September 1985	
	5 dong	123 × 61 mm	Green	Coat of Arms	Fishery	1976	2 May 1978	14 September 1985	
	10 dong	131 × 63 mm	Purple-Blue	Coat of Arms	Elephant, logging	1976	2 May 1978	14 September 1985	
	10 dong	131 × 65 mm	Purple	Coat of Arms	Ho Chi Minh house	1980	1980	14 September 1985	
	20 dong	141 × 70 mm	Blue	Ho Chi Minh	Tractors, hydroelectric dam	1976	2 May 1978	14 September 1985	
	30 dong	143 × 71 mm	Red-Brown	Ho Chi Minh	Freighters; "Dragon's House" (Nha Rong), Ho Chi Minh museum, Saigon	1981	1981	14 September 1985	
	50 dong	151 × 75 mm	Red	Ho Chi Minh	Hong Gai open pit mining	1976	2 May 1978	14 September 1985	
	100 dong	158 × 80 mm	Brown-Yellow	Ho Chi Minh	Ha Long Bay	1980	1980	14 September 1985	
These images are to scale at 0.7 pixel per millimetre (18 pixel per inch). For table standards, see the banknote specification table.

=== Second dong ===
In 1985, notes were introduced in denominations of 5 hao, 1, 2, 5, 10, 20, 30, 50, 100, and 500 dong. As inflation became endemic, these first banknotes were followed by 200, 1,000, 2,000, and 5,000 dong notes in 1987, by 10,000 and 50,000 dong notes in 1990, by a 20,000 dong note in 1991, a 100,000 dong note in 1994, a 500,000 dong note in 2003, and a 200,000 dong note in 2006. Banknotes with denominations of 5,000 dong and under have been discontinued from production, but as of 2015 are still in wide circulation.

Five banknote series have appeared. Except for the current series, dated 2003, all were confusing to the user, lacking unified themes and coordination in their designs. The first table below shows the latest banknotes, of 100 dong or higher, prior to the current series.

On 7 June 2007, the government ordered cessation of the issuance of the cotton 50,000 and 100,000 dong notes. They were taken out of circulation by 1 September 2007. State Bank of Vietnam 10,000 and 20,000 dong cotton notes are no longer in circulation as of 1 January 2013.

Second dong (1985)
Image	Value	Dimensions	Main Color	Description		Date of			
Image	Value	Dimensions	Main Color	Obverse	Reverse	printing	issue	issue suspended	withdrawal
	5 hao	100 × 50 mm	Pink	Flag Tower of Hanoi	Denomination	1985	14 September 1985	Unknown	
	1 dong	114 × 57 mm	Blue-Green	Flag Tower of Hanoi	Hòn Phụ Tử (Father and Son islet)	1985	14 September 1985	Unknown	
	2 dong	110 × 56 mm	Purple	Flag Tower of Hanoi	Boats	1985	14 September 1985	Unknown	
	5 dong	128 × 64 mm	Green	Flag Tower of Hanoi	Boats in Hue	1985	14 September 1985	Unknown	
	10 dong	128 × 64 mm	Red	Flag Tower of Hanoi	Ngoc Son Temple	1985	14 September 1985	Unknown	
	20 dong	128 × 64 mm	Purple	Ho Chi Minh	One Pillar pagoda	1985	14 September 1985	Unknown	
	30 dong	150 × 75 mm	Blue	Ho Chi Minh	Ben Thanh Market	1985	14 September 1985	Unknown	
	50 dong	150 × 75 mm	Green	Ho Chi Minh	Thac Ba hydro power plant	1985	14 September 1985	Unknown	
	50 dong	149 × 75 mm	Pink	Ho Chi Minh	Thang Long bridge	1985	1987	Unknown	
	100 dong	158 × 78 mm	Brown	Ho Chi Minh	Rice planting	1985	14 September 1985	Unknown	
	500 dong	158 × 78 mm	Red	Ho Chi Minh	Bim Son cement plant	1985	14 September 1985	Unknown	
These images are to scale at 0.7 pixel per millimetre (18 pixel per inch). For table standards, see the banknote specification table.

=== Third dong ===
Third dong (1987–2000)
Image	Value	Dimensions	Main Color	Description		Date of			
Image	Value	Dimensions	Main Color	Obverse	Reverse	Printing	Issue	Issue Suspended	Withdrawal
	100 dong	120 × 60 mm	Green	Coat of Arms	Phổ Minh Temple	1991	2 May 1992	1994	Current, but rarely used
	200 dong	130 × 65 mm	Orange	Ho Chi Minh	Agricultural production	1987	30 September 1987	2015	Current, but rarely used
	500 dong	130 × 65 mm	Pink	Ho Chi Minh	Port Haiphong	1988	15 August 1989	2015	Current, but rarely used
	1,000 dong	134 × 65 mm	Brown-Green	Ho Chi Minh	Coal Mining	1987	2 March 1988	20 October 1989	
	2,000 dong	134 × 65 mm	Brown-Pink	Ho Chi Minh	Thai Nguyen Iron and Steel Corporation	1987	2 March 1988	20 October 1989	
	1,000 dong	134 × 65 mm	Green	Ho Chi Minh	Lumber production	1988	20 October 1989	2015	Current
	2,000 dong	134 × 65 mm	Pink	Ho Chi Minh	Textile factory	1988	20 October 1989	2015	Current
	5,000 dong	134 × 65 mm	Blue	Ho Chi Minh	Offshore platform	1987	2 March 1988	15 January 1993	
	5,000 dong	134 × 65 mm	Blue	Ho Chi Minh	Trị An hydropower plant	1991	15 January 1993	2015	Current
	10,000 dong	140 × 68 mm	Red	Ho Chi Minh	Hạ Long Bay	1990	2 May 1992	1994	1 January 2013
	10,000 dong	140 × 68 mm	Red	Ho Chi Minh	Hạ Long Bay	1993	15 October 1994	2006	1 January 2013
	20,000 dong	140 × 68 mm	Blue	Ho Chi Minh	Canned food factory	1991	2 March 1993	2006	1 January 2013
	50,000 dong	140 × 68 mm	Green	Ho Chi Minh	Nhà Rồng Port	1990	2 March 1993	1994	1 September 2007
	50,000 dong	140 × 68 mm	Green	Ho Chi Minh	Nhà Rồng Port	1994	15 October 1994	2003	1 September 2007
	100,000 dong	145 × 71 mm	Brown	Ho Chi Minh	Ho Chi Minh's ethnic house	1994	1 September 2000	2004	1 September 2007
These images are to scale at 0.7 pixel per millimetre (18 pixel per inch). For table standards, see the banknote specification table.

The one-hundred-dong bill technically remains in circulation, however due to its low value (roughly US$0.004) it is rarely ever used for transactions. The bill is largely seen as a collectible or an oddity, with it often selling for many times its original face value.

In 2003 Vietnam began replacing its cotton banknotes with plastic polymer banknotes, claiming that this would reduce the cost of printing. Many newspapers in the country criticized these changes, citing mistakes in printing and alleging that the son of the governor of the State Bank of the Vietnam benefited from printing contracts. The government clamped down on these criticisms by banning two newspapers from publishing for a month and considering other sanctions against other newspapers. Even though the 2003 series banknotes listed in the table below have now completely replaced the old notes of the same denominations, as of 2019 the cotton fibre banknotes of 200, 500, 1,000, 2,000, and 5,000 dong still remain in wide circulation and are universally accepted.

2003 Polymer Series
Image		Value	Dimensions	Main Color	Description		Date of			
Obverse	Reverse	Value	Dimensions	Main Color	Obverse	Reverse	Printing	Issue	Issue Suspended	Withdrawal
		10,000 dong	132 × 60 mm	Yellow	Ho Chi Minh	Bạch Hổ oil field	The first two digits of the serial number give the last two digits of the year of issue.	30 August 2006	Current	
		20,000 dong	136 × 65 mm	Blue	Ho Chi Minh	Covered bridge in Hội An	The first two digits of the serial number give the last two digits of the year of issue.	17 May 2006	Current	
		50,000 dong	140 × 65 mm	Pink	Ho Chi Minh	Huế	The first two digits of the serial number give the last two digits of the year of issue.	17 December 2003	Current	
		100,000 dong	144 × 65 mm	Green	Ho Chi Minh	Temple of Literature	The first two digits of the serial number give the last two digits of the year of issue.	1 September 2004	Current	
		200,000 dong	148 × 65 mm	Red	Ho Chi Minh	Hạ Long Bay	The first two digits of the serial number give the last two digits of the year of issue.	30 August 2006	Current	
		500,000 dong	152 × 65 mm	Cyan	Ho Chi Minh	Ho Chi Minh's birthplace in Kim Liên	The first two digits of the serial number give the last two digits of the year of issue.	17 December 2003	Current	
These images are to scale at 0.7 pixel per millimetre (18 pixel per inch). For table standards, see the banknote specification table.

A commemorative polymer 50 dong banknote dedicated to the fiftieth anniversary of the State Bank of Vietnam was issued in 2001, but its face value is so tiny that it clearly was meant only for collectors. The note is available in three forms, by itself, in a presentation folder or in a presentation folder in an envelope. In 2016, a 100 dong banknote was issued on cotton-based paper to commemorate the 65th anniversary of central banking.

Commemorative Notes
Image	Value	Dimensions	Main Color	Materials	Description		Date of	
Image	Value	Dimensions	Main Color	Materials	Obverse	Reverse	Printing	Issue
	50 dong	165 × 82 mm	Pink	Polymer	Ho Chi Minh	State Bank of Vietnam	2001	May 2001
	100 dong	163 × 82 mm	Red	Paper	Ho Chi Minh	State Bank of Vietnam	2016	6 May 2016
These images are to scale at 0.7 pixel per millimetre (18 pixel per inch). For table standards, see the banknote specification table.

== Bearer's checks 1992–2002 ==
To support the growing industrial need for large money transactions, the State Bank issued "Bearer's Checks" or "State Bank Settlement Checks" (Ngân Phiếu Thanh Toán) in denominations from 100,000 to 5,000,000 dong. To prevent counterfeiting, these notes had many degrees of protection, their designs were changed every five to six months, and they had expiration dates five or six months after the date of issue. The checks worked until the banking system was upgraded to handle electronic transfers of large amounts of đồng, making most large transactions unnecessary.

== Currency devaluation ==
In November 2009, the Vietnamese government decided to devalue the Vietnamese dong by 5% and simultaneously raise interest rates to 8%. This was seen as a move that could destabilize the financial markets in Asia, as economies in the region were competing for an advantage over the European and American markets.

On 11 February 2010, the State Bank of Vietnam (SBV) adjusted the interbank exchange rate between the Vietnamese dong (VND) and the US dollar (USD) to 18,544 VND/USD, a devaluation of 3.25% from the previous rate of 17,941 VND/USD. 17 August 2010, The SBV further devalued the VND by 2.04% to 18,932 VND/USD, an increase of 388 dong from the previous rate.

On 11 February 2011, the SBV announced a decision to increase the interbank exchange rate between USD and VND from 18,932 VND to 20,693 VND (a 9.3% increase). Along with that, the SBV also narrowed the applicable range for the exchange rates of commercial banks from ±3% to ±1%. However, by 19 February 2011, the USD exchange rate on the black market was 22,300 VND.

=== 2022 to 2024 ===
In response to increasing pressure on the Vietnamese dong as a result of high inflation in the US, on 17 October 2022, the decision was made to increase the dong's trading band from 3 to 5 percent. As a result, from 16 to 24 October, the currency lost 2.98 percent of its value falling from 24,135 to 24,845 Vietnamese dong to the dollar. This decline has continued into 2024 with the dong losing about 4.5 percent of its value between 1 January 2024, and the end of July.

== Exchange rate ==
Current VND exchange rates
From Google Finance:	AUD CAD CHF CNY EUR GBP HKD JPY USD INR KRW
From Yahoo! Finance:	AUD CAD CHF CNY EUR GBP HKD JPY USD INR KRW
From XE.com:	AUD CAD CHF CNY EUR GBP HKD JPY USD INR KRW
From OANDA:	AUD CAD CHF CNY EUR GBP HKD JPY USD INR KRW

After the revaluation of the Zimbabwean dollar on 1 August 2006, the dong became the least valued currency unit for months. Around 21 March 2007, the revalued Zimbabwean dollar regained least valued currency status (in terms of black market exchange rate), and on 7 September 2007 in terms of official exchange rate. After the use of the Zimbabwean dollar ceased on 12 April 2009, the dong was the second least valued currency unit after the Iranian rial as of 28 November 2014. Since 19 June 2014, the Vietnamese dong has been devalued a total of five times in an effort to help spur exports and to ensure the stability of the currency.

Year	USD Exchange Rate
1960	97
1970	410
1980	2,050
1990	6,500
2000	14,428
2010	19,495
2020	23,173
2022	22,862
2024	25,287
August 2024	25,135
January 2025	25,270
June 2025	26,095

Sources: www%20tradingeconomics.com, IMF

== See also ==
- Economy of Vietnam
- Vietnamese cash
- VND Index

First dong
Preceded by: North Vietnamese dong Location: North Vietnam; Reason: currency unification Ratio: at par	Currency of Vietnam; 1978 – 1985; Note: banknotes are dated 1976	Succeeded by: Second dong Reason: inflation Ratio: 1 second dong = 10 first dong
Preceded by: South Vietnamese liberation dong Location: South Vietnam; Reason: currency unification Ratio: 1 new dong = 0.8 liberation dong	Currency of Vietnam; 1978 – 1985; Note: banknotes are dated 1976	Succeeded by: Second dong Reason: inflation Ratio: 1 second dong = 10 first dong
Preceded by: No universal currency Reason: Vietnamese invasion of Cambodia; Note: It is unclear whether the North, the South dong, or nothing at all was used after the invasion in January 1980 and before the issuance of a united dong in May	Currency of Cambodia; 1978 – 1980; Concurrent with: Thai baht and some other foreign currencies, to some extent	Succeeded by: Cambodian riel Reason: reintroduction of a national currency Ratio: 1 riel = 3 dong = 0.25 US dollar = 1 kg rice

Second dong
Preceded by: First dong Reason: inflation Ratio: 1 second dong = 10 first dong	Currency of Vietnam; 1985 –	Succeeded by: Current
