= Institut d'Émission =

In the French-speaking world, an Institut d'Émission (lit. 'authority of Issue') refers to a bank of issue (generally in 19th-century contexts) or a currency board (20th century).

- Institut d'Émission des États du Cambodge, du Laos et du Viet-nam, for French Indochina (1952–1954)
- Institut d'Émission de l'Afrique Occidentale Française et du Togo, for French West Africa (1955–1959)
- Institut d'Émission de l'Afrique Équatoriale Française et du Cameroun, for French Central Africa (1955–1959)
- Institut d'Émission des Départements d'Outre-Mer, for French overseas collectivities in the Atlantic, Caribbean, and Indian Ocean (est. 1959)
- Institut d'Émission d'Outre-Mer, for French overseas collectivities in the Pacific (est. 1966)
- Institut d'Émission Malgache, for Madagascar (1962–1974)
- Institut d'Émission des Comores, for the Comoros (1974–1981)

== See also ==
- Banque d'Émission du Rwanda et du Burundi, for Belgian Rwanda and Burundi (1960–1964)
