= Institut d'Émission des États du Cambodge, du Laos et du Viet-nam =

Currency board in Asia

The Institut d'Émission des États du Cambodge, du Laos et du Viet-nam (lit. '[note-]issuance authority of the states of Cambodia, Laos and Vietnam'), also known as the Institut d'Émission des États Associés, was a short-lived currency board operating in French Indochina in 1952–1954.

== Overview ==
The institute was established by the French authorities after they decided to phase out the note-issuing privilege of Banque de l'Indochine in French Indochina. It was first envisaged at the French-Vietnamese Dalat conference of 1946, and enabled by legislation in 1948 that was however only implemented three years later. The institute was eventually established in December 1951 and started operations on 1 January 1952. While its seat was legally established in Phnom Penh, the building of a proper head office there was delayed, and in practice the institute was run from Saigon. The currency it issued, the French Indochinese piastre, was popularly known as the "Bao Dai piastre" with reference to Bảo Đại, by then Vietnam's Chief of State, whose portrait was featured on the institute's banknotes.

The institute was ostensibly governed jointly by France, Cambodia, Laos and the State of Vietnam, but it remained practically controlled by France. It subcontracted much of its operations, including banknote printing, to the still-powerful Banque de l'Indochine. It opened offices in Paris, Phnom Penh and Saigon in 1952, and in Vientiane in 1953. But it soon found itself overrun by events, namely the end of the protectorates in Cambodia and Laos in 1953 and the 1954 Geneva Conference that ended the First Indochina War.

On 1 January 1955, in application of a quadripartite agreement signed only three days earlier in Paris, the role of the Institut d'Émission was taken over by the National Bank of Cambodia in the Kingdom of Cambodia, the National Bank of Laos in the Kingdom of Laos, and the National Bank of Vietnam in the State of Vietnam, respectively issuing the Cambodian riel, Lao kip, and South Vietnamese đồng. The Institute simultaneously ceased operations and was liquidated a few days later.

== Leadership ==
The institute's chairman (French: Président) throughout its brief existence was former French Resistance leader Gaston Cusin.

== See also ==
- Institut d'Émission
- List of central banks
