= Henri Martin affair =

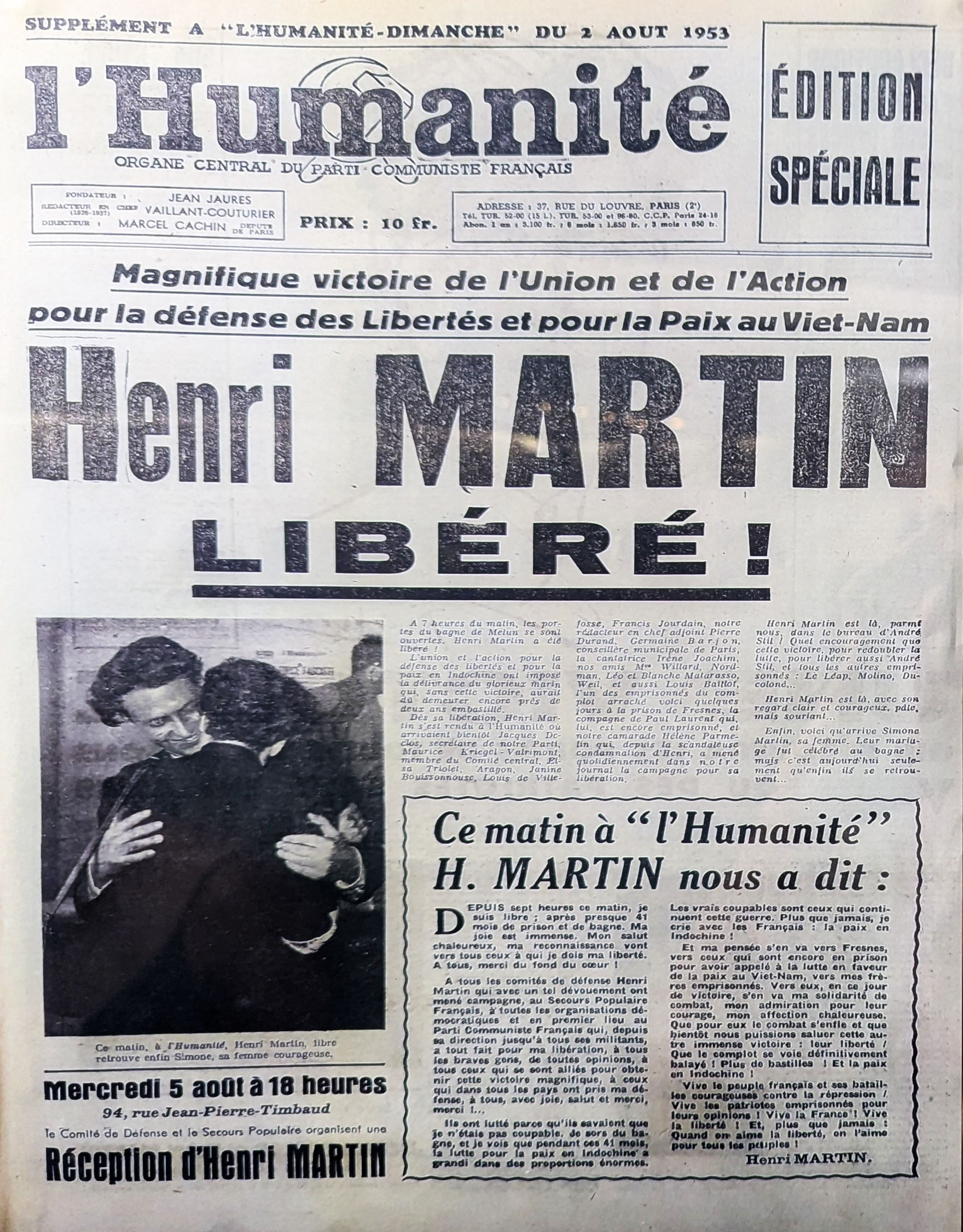
Front page of the Supplément to L'Humanité Dimanche of August 2, 1953, on the release of Henri Martin

The Henri Martin affair was a political-military scandal that occurred under the French Fourth Republic during the First Indochina War in the early 1950s. Henri Martin, a French communist (PCF) activist, was arrested by the military police in 1950 for sabotage, convicted and imprisoned until 1953.

== Background ==
Martin was sent to French Indochina in 1945 as a sailor, hoping to fight against the Japanese occupation, but Japanese forces had already been disarmed by the time he arrived. Martin witnessed the French Navy's shelling of Haiphong on November 23, 1946. Martin submitted his resignation, which was refused, and he eventually returned to Toulon.

There, in contact with local communists, he engaged in propaganda activities at the Toulon naval base, distributing leaflets encouraging sailors to demand a complete and immediate cessation of hostilities in Indochina.

The military police arrested Martin on March 13, 1950, for complicity in sabotage. Although he was eventually found not guilty of sabotage, the Brest naval tribunal nevertheless sentenced him on October 20 to five years imprisonment for distributing propaganda hostile to the Indochina War.

While Martin's membership in the communist movement was not publicly known, it was hardly in doubt to investigators. During this time, a number of activists had already been jailed for illegal actions against the Indochina War, but the Martin Affair stood out due to the disproportionate sentence of five years for a simple political activity against military regulation.

This affair put Martin in the spotlight as a symbol of the "struggle of the French people against the dirty Indochina War". At the initiative of the French Communist Party, as well as intellectual and political elites, a defence committee was formed. Notable figures in support of Martin included Jean-Marie Domenach and his magazine Esprit, Jean Cocteau, and Jean-Paul Sartre, who at the end of 1953 published a book entitled The Henri Martin Affair.

The campaign against Martin's sentence reached a fevered pitch, with meetings, strikes, and leaflets in his support. On May 19, 1951, the judgement was set aside and formally expunged by July 19, yet Martin was not freed until August 2, 1953.

Years later, Philippe Robrieux wrote that the Martin Affair took on proportions that recalled the Dreyfus affair.

== See also ==
- Henri Martin
- French Communist Party
- Generals' affair
- First Indochina War
- Piastres affair
