= Lao kip =

Currency of Laos

ເງີນກີບລາວ (Lao); Ngoenkib Lav (Lao)
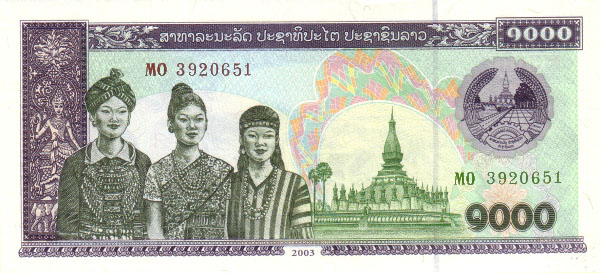
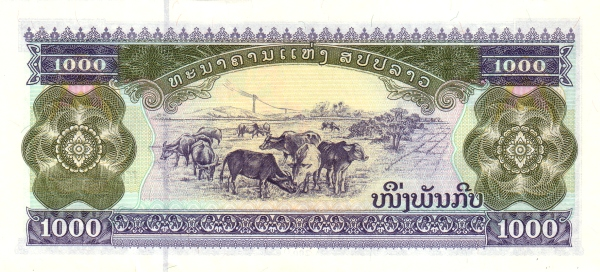
- 1000 kip issued in 2003

ISO 4217
- Code: LAK (numeric: 418) before 1980: LAJ
- Subunit: 0.01

Units of account
- Symbol: ₭ or ₭N
- Subunit
- 1/100: att

Denominations
- Banknotes
- Freq. used: 500₭, 1,000₭, 2,000₭, 5,000₭, 10,000₭, 20,000₭, 50,000₭, 100,000₭
- Rarely used: 1₭, 5₭, 10₭, 20₭, 50₭, 100₭
- Coins
- Rarely used: 10 att, 20 att, 50 att

Demographics
- User(s): Laos

Issuance
- Central bank: Bank of the Lao P.D.R.
- Website: www.bol.gov.la

Valuation
- Inflation: 4%
- Source: Bank of the Lao P.D.R, October 2025.

₭

Lao kip
- In Unicode: U+20AD ₭ KIP SIGN

Currency
- Currency: Lao kip

The kip (Lao: ກີບ, romanized: kib; code: LAK; sign: ₭ or ₭N; French: kip; officially Lao: ເງີນກີບລາວ, romanized: Ngoenkib Lav, lit. 'currency Lao kip') is the currency of Laos since 1953. Historically, one kip was divided into 100 att (ອັດ) which are no longer in regular use. The term derives from ກີບ kì:p, a Lao word meaning "ingot."

== History ==
=== French Indochina ===
The piastre was the currency of French Indochina between 1885 and 1952.

=== Free Lao Kip (1946) ===
In 1945–1946, the Free Lao government in Vientiane issued a series of paper money in denominations of 10, 20, and 50 att and 10 kip before the French authorities took control of the region.

=== Royal Kip (1953) ===
The kip was reintroduced in 1953, replacing the French Indochinese piastre at par. The kip (also called a piastre in French) was sub-divided into 100 att (Lao: ອັດ) or cents (French: Centimes). It was pegged to the French franc at a rate of 10 francs per kip.

On 10 October 1958, the kip's peg switched to the US dollar, and was officially devalued from ₭35 to ₭80 per US dollar: however, the official exchange rate did not reflect market conditions at the time, with the parallel rate reaching ₭600 per dollar by the end of 1963. Laos devalued the kip again on 1 January 1964, and adopted an official rate of ₭240 per dollar and a "free market" rate of about ₭505 per dollar: the free market rate then fell to ₭600 per dollar on 8 November 1971, with the official rate being abolished on 4 April 1972.

=== Pathet Lao Kip (1976) ===
The Pathet Lao introduced the "liberation kip" on 12 October 1968, for circulation in the areas that the group controlled. Banknotes for the liberation kip, which were printed in China, consisted of ₭1, ₭10, ₭20, ₭50, ₭100, ₭200 and ₭500.

According to the Pathet Lao's media outlet Siang Pasason, one liberation kip was worth 6 royal kip on 20 August 1975, three days before the Pathet Lao entered Vientiane. Based on historic exchange rates provided by the International Monetary Fund, one US dollar in 1975 was worth 725 royal kip or 120.83 liberation kip.

In 1976, the new communist Laotian government replaced the royal kip with the liberation kip. The exchange rate was 20 royal kip per liberation kip. A currency confiscation was carried out, where individuals could exchange up to 100,000 royal kip for liberation kip, and businesses up to one million royal kip; they had to deposit the rest in state-owned banks.

=== Lao PDR Kip (1979) ===
On 16 December 1979, the former Pathet Lao "liberation kip" was replaced by the new Lao kip at a rate of 100 to 1.

== Coins ==
=== Royal Kip (1952) ===
Coins were issued in denominations of 10, 20 and 50 att or cents with French and Lao inscriptions. All were struck in aluminum and had a hole in the centre, like the Chinese cash coins. The only year of issue was 1952.

=== Lao PDR Kip (1979) ===
Coins were again issued in Laos for the first time in 28 years in 1980 with denominations of 10, 20 and 50 att, with each being struck in aluminum and depicting the state emblem on the obverse and agricultural themes on the reverse. These were followed by commemorative 1, 5, 10, 20 and 50 kip coins issued in 1985 for the 10th anniversary of the establishment of the Lao People's Democratic Republic. However, due to the economic toll of the Soviet collapse in 1991 and the persistence of chronic inflation, coins are rarely seen in circulation.

Obverse	Reverse	Value	Obverse	Reverse	Composition	Date of issue
		10 att	Value, farmer	Emblem of Laos (1975-1991 version)	Aluminum	1980
		20 att	Value, farmer ploughing with ox	Emblem of Laos (1975-1991 version)	Aluminum	1980
		50 att	Value, fish	Emblem of Laos (1975-1991 version)	Aluminum	1980

== Banknotes ==
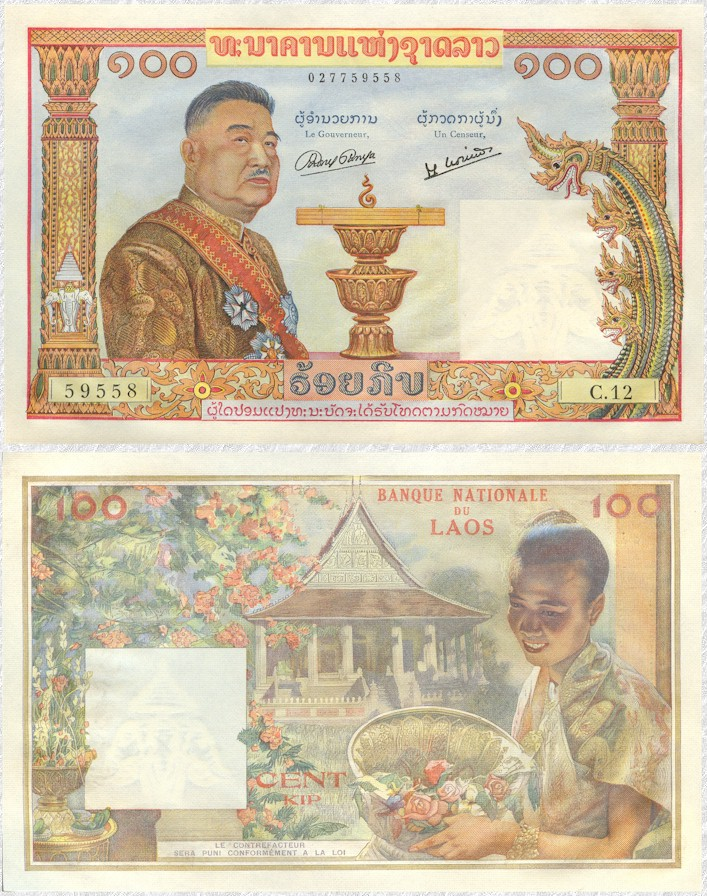
100 kip, 1957 issue

In 1953, the Laos branch of the Institut d'Emission des États du Cambodge, du Laos et du Vietnam issued notes dual denominated in piastre and kip. At the same time, the two other branches had similar arrangements with the riel in Cambodia and the đồng in South Vietnam. There were notes for 1, 5, 10 and 100 kip/piastres.

In 1957, the government issued notes denominated solely in kip. The notes were for 1, 5, 10, 20 and 50 kip printed by the Security Banknote Company, 100 kip printed by the Banque de France and a commemorative 500 kip printed by De La Rue. 1 and 5 kip notes printed by Bradbury & Wilkinson, as well as 10 kip notes by De La Rue were introduced in 1962.

In 1963, 20, 50, 200 and 1000 kip notes were added, all printed by De La Rue. These were followed by 100, 500 and 5000 kip notes in 1974–75, again by De La Rue. 10 kip notes by Bradbury & Wilkinson and 1000 kip notes by De La Rue were printed but not circulated.

=== Pathet Lao Kip (1976) ===
Banknotes issued in 1975 or before in Pathet Lao controlled areas, and were in denominations of 1, 10, 20, 50, 100, 200 and 500 kip.

=== Lao PDR Kip (1979) ===
In 1979, banknotes were introduced in denominations of 1, 5, 10, 20, 50 and 100 kip. 500 kip notes were added in 1988, followed by 1000 kip in 1992, 2000 and 5000 kip in 1997, 10,000 and 20,000 kip in 2002 and 50,000 kip on January 17, 2006 (although dated 2004). On November 15, 2010, a 100,000 kip banknote was issued to commemorate the 450th anniversary of the founding of the capital, Vientiane, and the 35th anniversary of the establishment of the Lao People's Democratic Republic. Kaysone Phomvihane (1920–1992) is pictured on the obverse of the 2,000, 5,000, 10,000, 20,000, 50,000, and 100,000 kip banknotes.

The Bank of Laos governor announced on January 25, 2012, that the Bank of Laos would issue 100,000 Kip banknotes as a regular issue on February 1, 2012 (but dated 2011) to encourage Lao people to use the national currency instead of U.S. dollars and Thai baht. As of 2019, the ₭500 note is the smallest one commonly in circulation.

Current Series
Image		Value	Description		Date of issue
Obverse	Reverse	Value	Obverse	Reverse	Date of issue
		₭1	Militia unit at left, arms at upper right.	Classroom at left.	1979
		₭5	Shopping	Elephant-logging	1979
		₭10	Lumber mill at left, arms at upper right.	Hospital at left.	1979
		₭20	Arms at left, tank with troop column at center.	Textile mill at center.	1979
		₭50	Rice-planting	Hydroelectric dam	1979
		₭100	Harvesting	Bridge	1979
		₭500	Irrigation	Coffee bean harvesting	1988
		₭500	Irrigation	Coffee bean harvesting	2015
		₭1,000	Women from the three major ethnic groups of Laos: Lao Lum, Lao Sung and Lao Theung, with Pha That Luang in the background.	Cattle herd	1992-1996
		₭1,000	Women from the three major ethnic groups of Laos: Lao Lum, Lao Sung and Lao Theung, with Pha That Luang in the background.	Cattle herd	1998-2020
		₭1,000	Women from the three major ethnic groups of Laos: Lao Lum, Lao Sung and Lao Theung, with Pha That Luang in the background.	Cattle herd	2008
		₭2,000	President Kaysone Phomvihane (1920–1992), Pha That Luang	Hydroelectric complex in Xeset	1997-2003
		₭2,000	President Kaysone Phomvihane (1920–1992), Wat Xieng Thong in Luang Prabang	Hydroelectric complex in Xeset	2011
		₭5,000	President Kaysone Phomvihane; Pha That Luang	Cement factory in Vang Vieng	1997-2003
		₭5,000	President Kaysone Phomvihane; Pha That Luang	Cement factory in Vang Vieng	2020
		₭10,000	President Kaysone Phomvihane; Pha That Luang	Lao-Nippon bridge	2002-2003
		₭10,000	President Kaysone Phomvihane; Pha That Luang	Lao-Nippon bridge	2020
		₭20,000	President Kaysone Phomvihane; Wat Xieng Thong Temple	Theun Hinboun hydroelectric power plant	2002-2003
		₭20,000	President Kaysone Phomvihane; Pha That Luang	Theun Hinboun hydroelectric power plant	2020
		₭50,000	President Kaysone Phomvihane; Pha That Luang	Presidential Palace	2004
		₭50,000	President Kaysone Phomvihane; Pha That Luang	Presidential Palace	2020
		₭100,000	President Kaysone Phomvihane; Pha That Luang	President Kaysone Phomevihane Statue and Museum in Vientiane	2011
		₭100,000	President Kaysone Phomvihane; Pha That Luang	Viengxay Caves in Houaphanh Province	2020

Commemorative Banknotes
Image		Value	Description		Date of issue	Series Designation
Obverse	Reverse	Value	Obverse	Reverse	Date of issue	Series Designation
		₭100,000	Statue of King Setthathirath, Pha That Luang, Dok Champa flower and Nāga.	Haw Phra Kaew Temple	2010	P-40

== Lao kip exchange rate ==
Current LAK exchange rates
From Google Finance:	AUD CAD CHF CNY EUR GBP HKD JPY USD THB VND
From Yahoo! Finance:	AUD CAD CHF CNY EUR GBP HKD JPY USD THB VND
From XE.com:	AUD CAD CHF CNY EUR GBP HKD JPY USD THB VND
From OANDA:	AUD CAD CHF CNY EUR GBP HKD JPY USD THB VND

Date	US Dollar exchange rate
1 September 1997	1,021
1 September 1998	3,408
1 September 1999	7,680
1 September 2000	7,527
3 September 2001	7,600
2 September 2002	7,562
1 September 2003	7,562
1 December 2004	7,842
1 September 2005	10,380
1 September 2006	10,033
3 September 2007	9,580
1 September 2008	8,500
1 September 2009	8,477
1 September 2010	8,100
1 September 2011	8,000
3 September 2012	7,968
2 September 2013	7,838
1 September 2014	8,034
1 September 2015	8,135
1 September 2016	8,088
30 July 2017	8,300
30 July 2018	8,402
4 January 2019	8,550.97
1 September 2020	8,906.86
1 September 2021	9,354.13
1 September 2022	15,186.4
12 May 2022	15,505.80
20 February 2024	20,800
20 January 2026	21,594.44
20 September 2026	22,385.08

View source data.

== See also ==
- Institut d'Émission des États du Cambodge, du Laos et du Viet-nam

Royal kip
Preceded by: French Indochinese piastre Location: French Indochina; Reason: independence Ratio: at par Note: piastre not used in self-declared North Vietnam since 1946	Currency of Laos; 1953 – 1976; Note: transitional notes dual denominated in piastre and kip were used until 1957	Succeeded by: Pathet Lao kip Reason: inflation and new communist rule Ratio: 1 Pathet Lao kip = 20 royal kip

Pathet Lao kip
Preceded by: Royal kip Reason: inflation and new communist rule Ratio: 1 Pathet Lao kip = 20 royal kip	Currency of Laos; 1976 – 1979	Succeeded by: Lao PDR kip Reason: inflation Ratio: 1 Lao PDR kip = 100 Pathet Lao kip

Lao PDR kip
Preceded by: Pathet Lao kip Reason: inflation Ratio: 1 Lao PDR kip = 100 Pathet Lao kip	Currency of Laos; 1979 –	Succeeded by: Current
