= North Vietnamese đồng =

Former currency of North Vietnam (1946-78)

đồng Việt Nam Dân Chủ Cộng Hòa (Vietnamese)
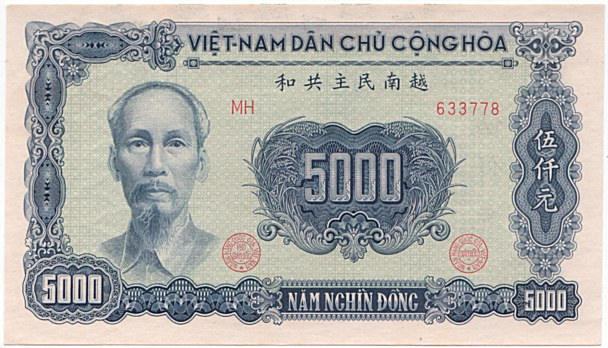
5000 Dong, 1953
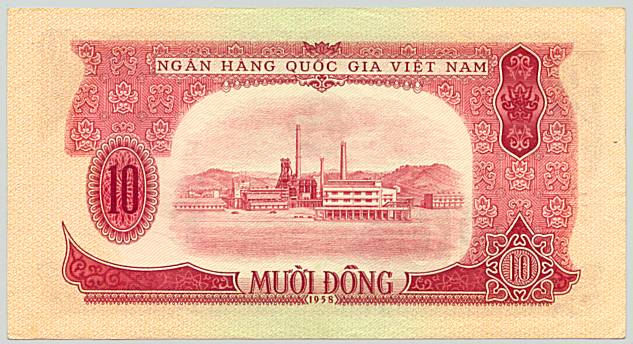
10 Dong, 1958

Unit
- Symbol: ₫

Denominations
- Subunit
- 1/10: hào
- 1/100: xu
- Banknotes: 2, 5 xu, 1, 2, 5 hào, 1, 2, 5, 10 đồng
- Coins: 1, 2, 5 xu

Demographics
- User(s): North Vietnam; Vietnam (until 1978)

Issuance
- Central bank: National Bank of Vietnam and State Bank of Vietnam
- Website: www.sbv.gov.vn
- This infobox shows the latest status before this currency was rendered obsolete.

The đồng (chữ Nôm: 銅; chữ Hán: 元, nguyên) (Note: Chữ Hán appeared on North Vietnamese banknotes that were issued until 1953. The term nguyên (元) was used for the Hán inscriptions, while đồng (銅) was used in Latin script as the name for the currency.) (/ˈdɒŋ/; Vietnamese: [ɗôŋm]) was the currency of North Vietnam from 3 November 1946 to 2 May 1978. It was subdivided into 10 hào, each itself divided into 10 xu.

== History ==
The first đồng issued by the communists controlling northern Vietnam was introduced on January 31, 1946, and replaced the French Indochinese piastre at par. Two revaluations followed. In 1951, the second đồng was introduced at a rate of 1 1951 đồng = 100 1946 đồng. However, some sources say there were two consecutive revaluations in 1951 and 1953, each with factor of 10. In 1954, this became the currency of the newly recognized state of North Vietnam, with an exchange rate to the still circulating piastre and South Vietnamese đồng of 32 northern đồng = 1 piastre or southern đồng. In 1956, the đồng was pegged to the Chinese renminbi yuan at a rate of 1.47 đồng = 1 yuan.

On 28 February 1959, another đồng replaced the second at a rate of 1 1959 đồng = 1000 1951 đồng. An exchange rate with the Soviet rouble was established in 1961, with 3.27 đồng = 1 rouble. On May 3, 1978, following the unification of Vietnam, the đồng was also unified. 1 new đồng = 1 northern đồng = 0.8 southern "liberation" đồng.

== Coins ==
=== 1946 đồng ===
In 1946, aluminium 20 xu, 5 hào and 1 đồng and bronze 2 đồng were issued, with the 20 xu coins dated 1945. These were the only coins issued for this currency, with no coins at all issued for the 1951 đồng.

Coins of the North Vietnamese đồng – 1946 issue
Obverse	Reverse	Denomination	Composition	Obverse	Reverse
		20 xu	aluminium	Star	Denomination
		5 hào	aluminium	Ceremonial urn	Denomination
		5 hào	aluminium	Ceremonial urn	Denomination
		1 đồng	aluminium	Hồ Chí Minh	Denomination
		2 đồng	bronze	Hồ Chí Minh	Star; denomination

=== 1958 đồng ===
In 1958, holed, aluminium coins in denominations of 1, 2 and 5 xu were introduced. These were the only coins issued in this currency.

Coins of the North Vietnamese đồng – 1958 issue
Obverse	Reverse	Denomination	Composition	Obverse	Reverse
		1 xu	Aluminium	An emblem similar in design to the coat of arms of North Vietnam; Nước Việt Nam Dân Chú Cộng Hòa	Ngân Hàng Quốc Gia Việt Nam; denomination; date
		2 xu	Aluminium	emblem similar in design to the coat of arms of North Vietnam; Nước Việt Nam Dân Chú Cộng Hòa	Ngân Hàng Quốc Gia Việt Nam; denomination; date
		5 xu	Aluminium	emblem similar in design to the coat of arms of North Vietnam; Nước Việt Nam Dân Chú Cộng Hòa	Ngân Hàng Quốc Gia Việt Nam; denomination; date

== Banknotes ==
=== 1946 đồng ===
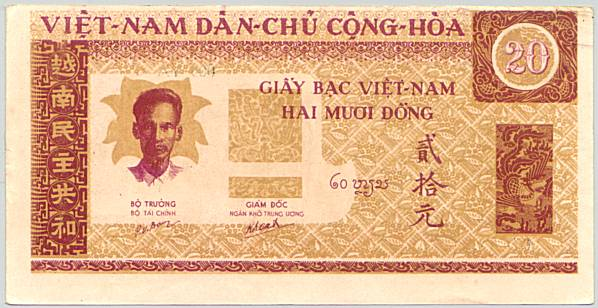
20 Dong, 1946

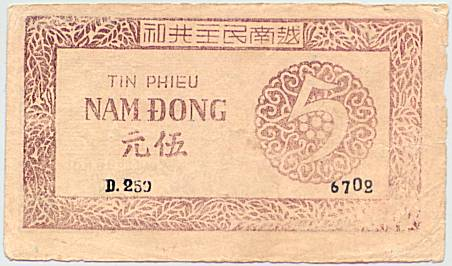
5 Dong, 1947

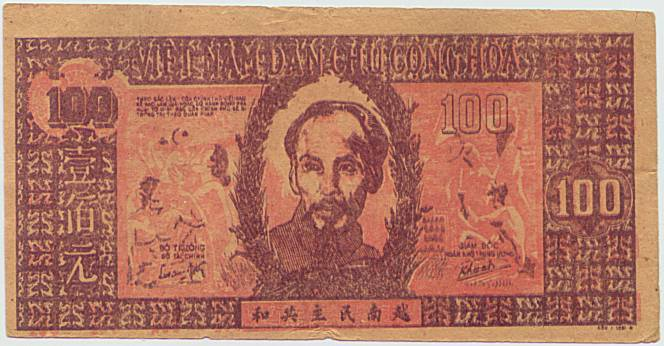
100 Dong, 1948

The government (Việt Nam Dân Chủ Cộng Hòa) issued two forms of paper money for this currency, "Vietnamese banknotes" (Giấy Bạc Việt Nam) and "Credit notes" (Tín Phiếu). In 1946, banknotes were introduced in denominations of 20 and 50 xu, 1, 5, 20, 50, 100 đồng, together with credit notes for 1 đồng. These were followed in 1948 by banknotes for 10 đồng and credit notes for 20 đồng, in 1949 by 500 đồng banknotes and 5 and 50 đồng credit notes, and in 1950 by 200 đồng banknotes and 100, 500 and 1000 đồng credit notes.

=== 1951 đồng ===
In 1951, the National Bank of Vietnam (Ngân hàng quốc gia Việt Nam, not to be confused with its Southern counterpart) introduced notes for 20, 50, 100, 200, 500 and 1000 đồng, with 5000 đồng notes added in 1953. These were the only circulating currency between 1951 and 1958.

=== 1959 đồng ===
In 1958, the National Bank introduced notes for 1 xu, 1, 2 and 5 hào, 1, 2, 5 and 10 đồng, with the 1 xu notes an overprint on an earlier, unissued type of 10 đồng note. In 1964, the State Bank of Vietnam (Ngân hàng Nhà nước Việt Nam) introduced 2 xu notes, followed by 5 xu, 1 and 2 hào in 1975.

== See also ==
- South Vietnamese đồng
- Economy of Vietnam

== Gallery ==
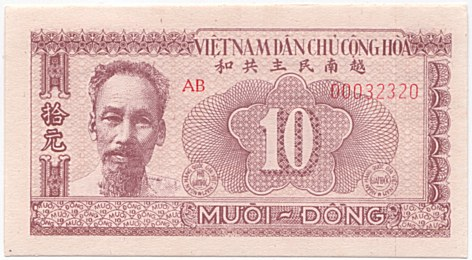
10 Dong (1951), obverse

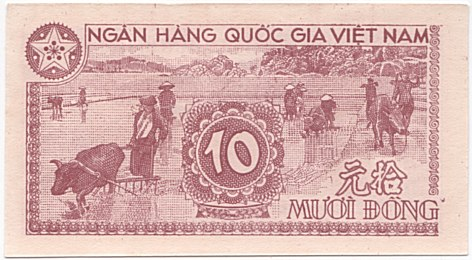
10 Dong (1951), reverse

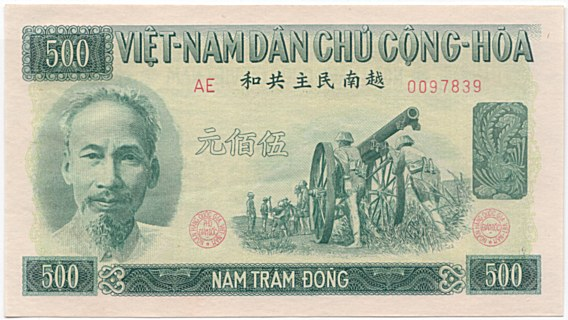
500 Dong (1951), obverse

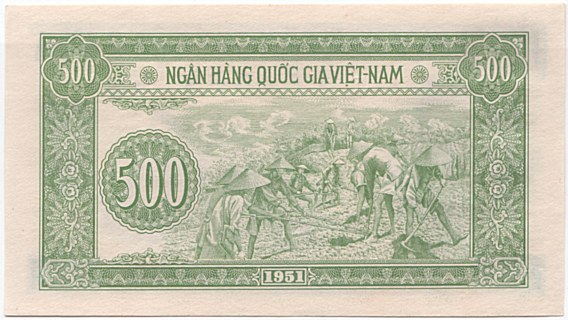
500 Dong (1951), reverse

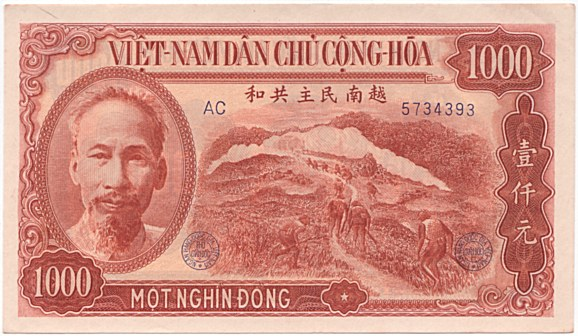
1000 Dong (1951), obverse

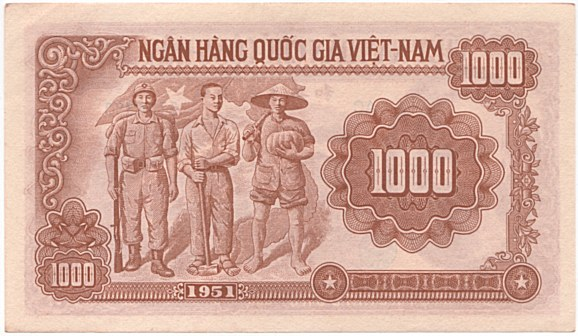
1000 Dong (1951), reverse

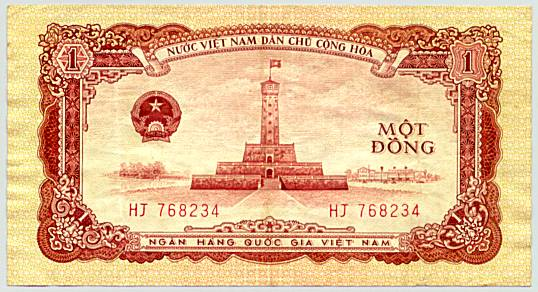
1 Dong (1958), obverse

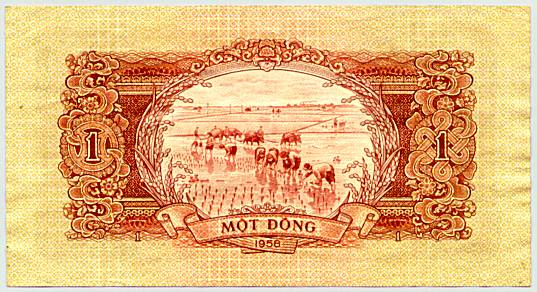
1 Dong (1958), reverse

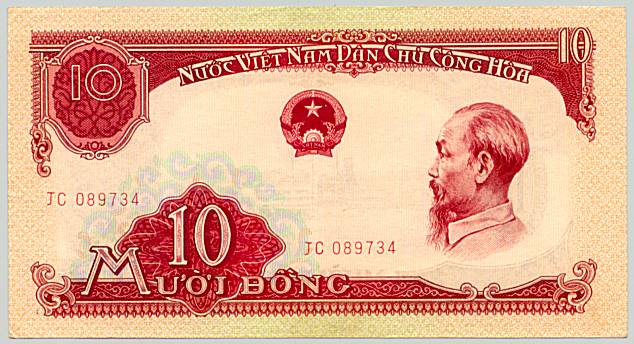
10 Dong (1958), obverse

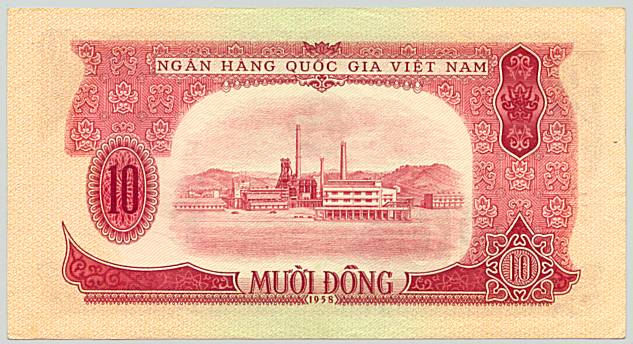
10 Dong (1958), reverse

== Notes ==
1946 đồng
Preceded by: French Indochinese piastre, Vietnamese cash Location: French Indochina; Reason: independence Ratio: at par (piastre); 20 văn = 1 đồng (cash)	Currency of North Vietnam; 1946 – 1951	Succeeded by: 1951 đồng Reason: inflation Ratio: 1 1951 đồng = 100 1946 đồng Note: some sources say there were 2 consecutive revaluations in 1951 and 1953, each with factor of 10

1951 đồng
Preceded by: 1946 đồng Reason: inflation Ratio: 1 1951 đồng = 100 1946 đồng Note: some sources say there were 2 consecutive revaluations in 1951 and 1953, each with factor of 10	Currency of North Vietnam; 1951 – 1959	Succeeded by: 1959 đồng Reason: inflation Ratio: 1 1959 đồng = 1000 1951 đồng

1959 đồng
Preceded by: 1951 đồng Reason: inflation Ratio: 1 1959 đồng = 1000 1951 đồng	Currency of North Vietnam (until 1976); Northern Vietnam (from 1976); 1959 – 1978	Succeeded by: Vietnamese đồng Location: Vietnam; Reason: currency unification Ratio: at par
