= Mexican real =

Currency of Mexico up to 1897

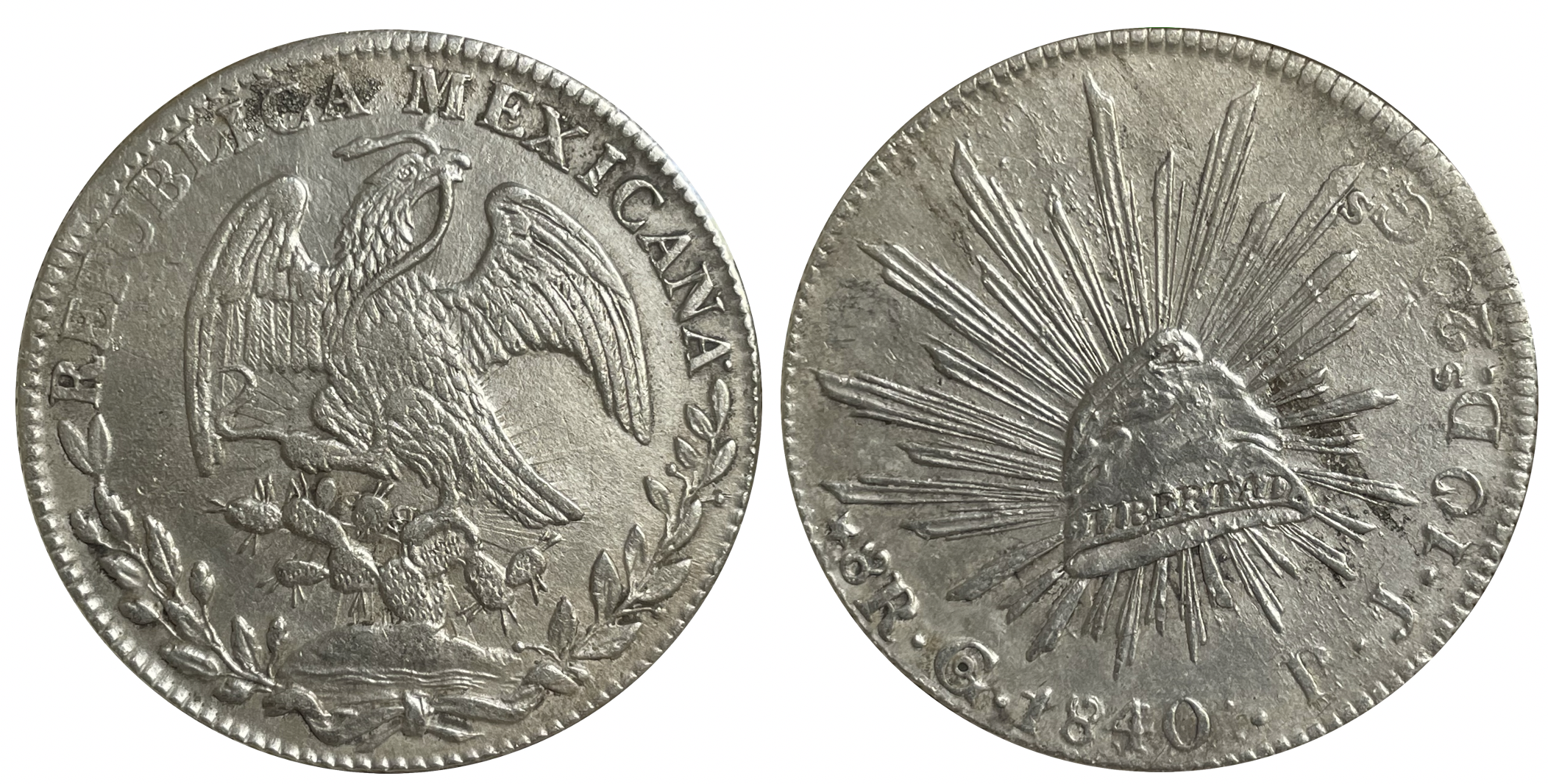
Silver coin: 8 reales Mexico, 1840 GoPJ

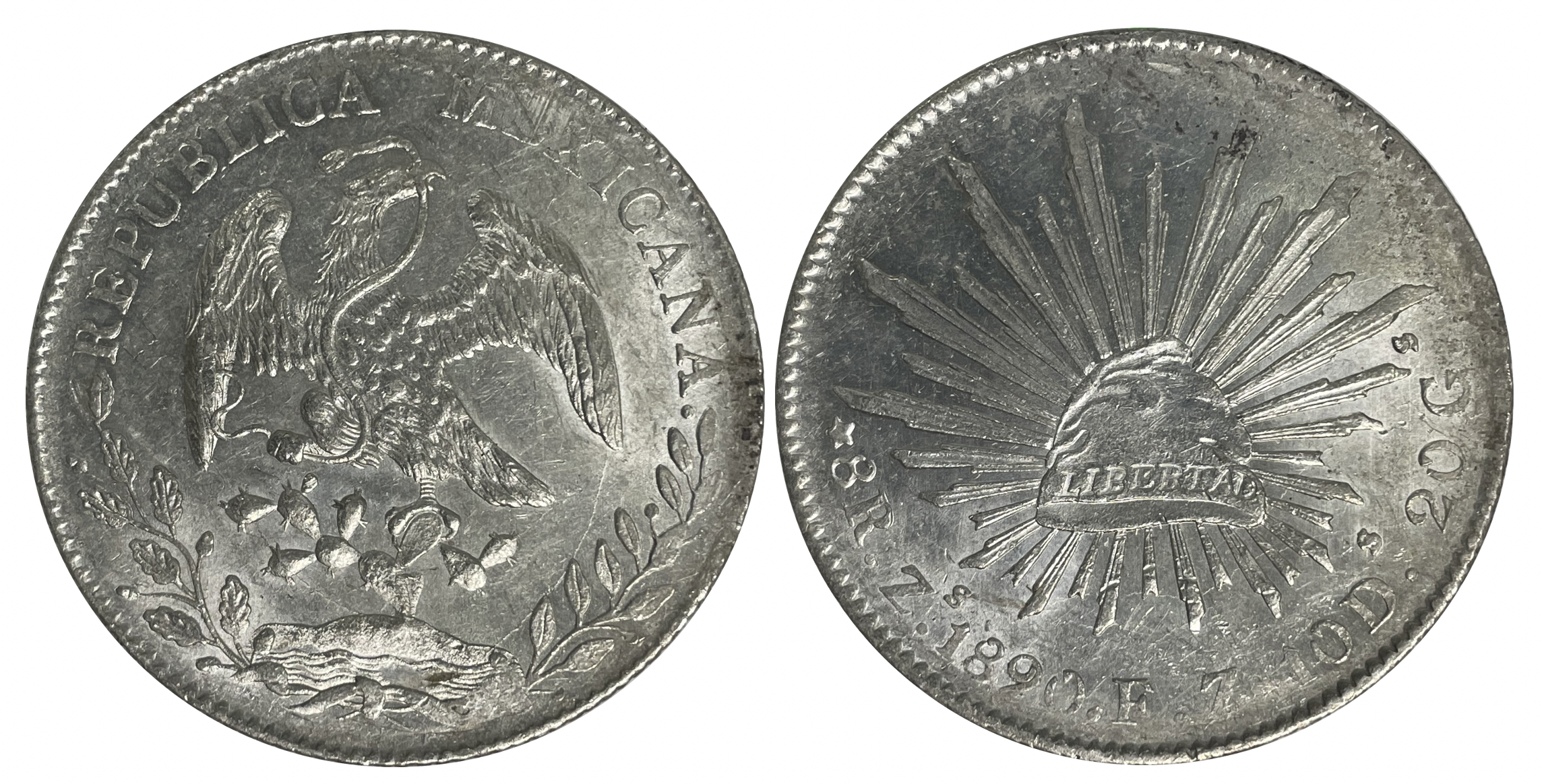
Silver coin: 8 reales Mexico, 1890 ZsFZ

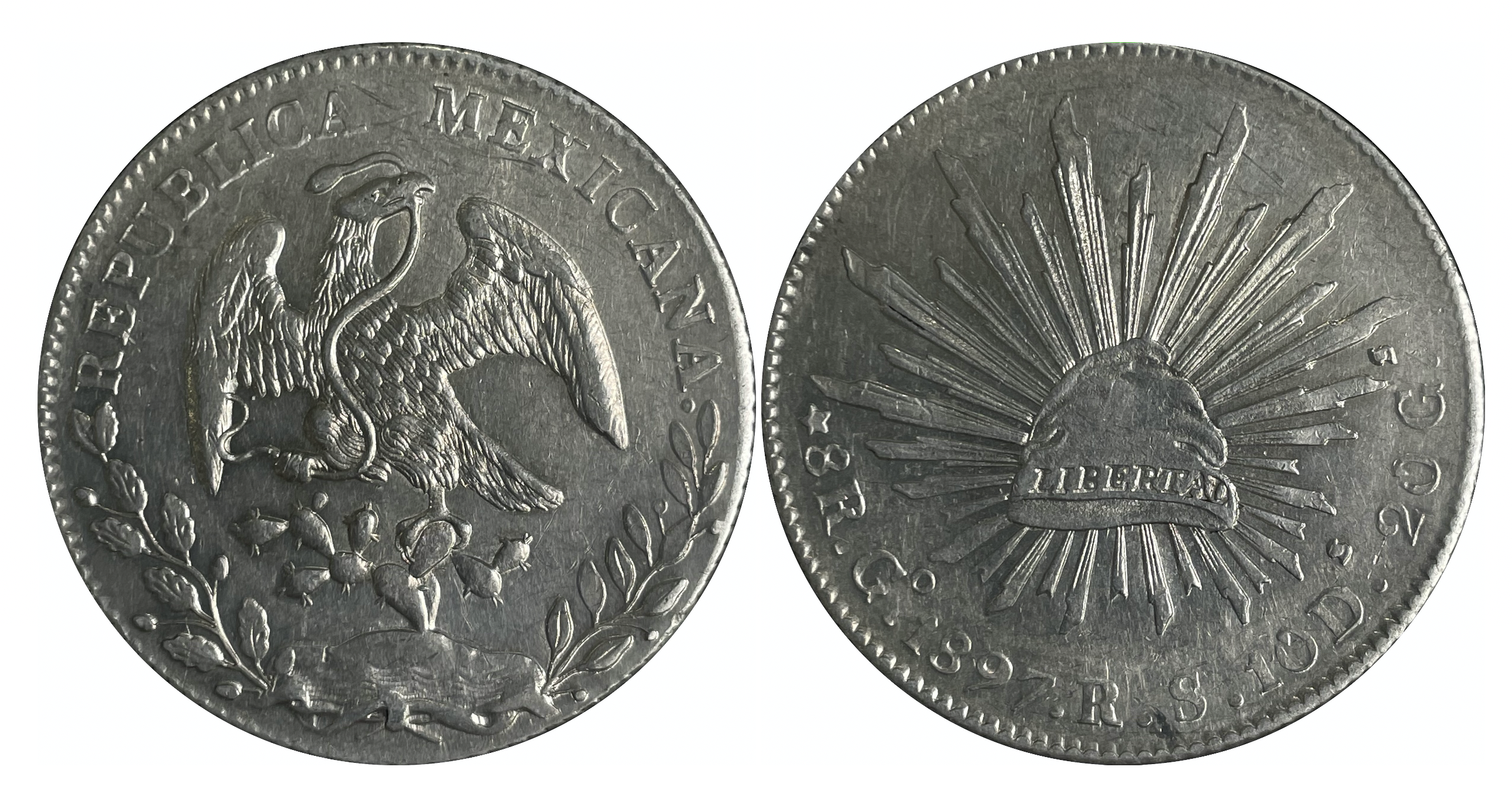
Silver coin: 8 reales Mexico, 1897 GoRS

The real was a currency of Mexico, issued until 1897. There were 16 silver reales to 1 gold escudo, with 8 tlacos to the real. The peso, which circulated alongside the real and eventually replaced it, was equal to 8 reales.

The first reales issued in Mexico were Spanish colonial reales. These were followed in 1822 by independent issues of Mexico. In 1863, Mexico began issuing a decimal currency based on the peso but coins denominated in reales (in particular 8 reales coins) continued to be minted until 1897.

== Coins ==
=== Colonial period ===
Spanish colonial Silver coins were issued in denominations of 1/4, 1/2, 1, 2, 4 and 8 reales, with gold coins for 1/2, 1, 2, 4 and 8 escudos. Between 1814 and 1821, copper coins were also issued for 1/8, 1/4 and 2/4 tlaco.

=== War of Independence ===
During the Mexican War of Independence (1810-1821), numerous mints operated, providing coins for both the supporters and opponents of the Spanish crown. The Royalist issued coins at mints in Chihuahua, Durango, Guadalajara, Guanajuato, Nueva Viscaya, Oaxaca, Real del Catorce, San Fernando de Bexar, San Luis Potosí, Sombrerete, Valladolid Michoacán and Zacatecas. Most Royalist issues were similar in style to the earlier colonial issues from the Mexico City mint with no new denominations issued.

Insurgent coins were minted at various locations including Nueva Galicia, Oaxaca, Puebla and Veracruz. There were also issues made in the names of the Supreme National Congress of America, the National Congress and the American Congress which, although considered Insurgent issues, bore the titles of Ferdinand VII. Both Royalists and Insurgents also issued countermarked pieces.

=== Empire of Iturbide ===
Between 1821 and 1823, coins were issued by the government of Agustín de Iturbide. There were copper 1/8 and 1/4 real, silver 1/2, 1, 2 and 8 reales, and gold 4 and 8 escudos.

The obverses of the silver and gold coins carried a variety of portraits of the Emperor with the legend "August(inus) Dei Prov(identia)" and the date, or "Augustinus Dei Providentia" and the date. The reverse had several different versions of the Mexican eagle, a golden eagle (Aquila chrysaetos). It was a traditional symbol of the Aztecs, but it was changed according to European heraldic traditions (see Coat of Arms of Mexico). The legends read "Mex I Imperator Constiiut" together with the denomination and assayer's initials.

=== Republic issues ===
With the adoption of the 1824 republican constitution, the United Mexican States began issuing coins. There were silver 1/2, 1, 2, 4 and 8 reales, and gold 1/2, 1, 2, 4 and 8 escudos, with silver 1/4 reales added in 1842. Copper coins for 1/16, 1/8 and 1/4 real were issued both by the Federal government at the Mexico City mint and by the state governments at various mints around the country.

On the republic's coins, the Mexican eagle moved to the obverse, with the legend "República Mexicana". The reverse featured a liberty cap with rays behind. The legend on the reverse reads "-denomination- -mintmark- -date- -assayer's initials- 10 Ds. 20 Gs." Mexico used the medieval system of dineros and granos to measure the fineness of their coins, twelve dineros designating pure silver with each dinero divided into 24 granos. A coin of 10 Ds. 20 Gs equated to .902777 fine.

The brief reign of Maximillian (1864–67) interrupted the production of republic type coins and many of the denominations ceased production either in 1863 or by 1870, as the decimal currency based on the peso was introduced. However, 8 reales coins continued in production until 1897.
