= Generals' affair =

The Generals' Affair (also known as Revers Report, Rapport Revers) was a political-military scandal that happened under the French Fourth Republic during the First Indochina War. It lasted from September 1949 to November 1950.

== Revers Mission (May–June 1949) ==
French Army Chief of Staff General Georges Revers was sent to French Indochina in the summer of 1949 to inquire about the military situation on the ground and the morale of the French troops. The report of his mission was to become known as the Rapport Revers (Revers Report).

== Generals' Affair (September 1949) ==
The scandal burst in September 1949; by December, General Revers was dismissed.

The Revers Report drew a very pessimistic conclusion about the French situation in Indochina. Revers concluded that France could not realistically continue its colonial presence in the country using military means, and that it would need to seek a "peace of the brave" with the leader of the Democratic Republic of Vietnam's Ho Chi Minh. Faced with a lack of manpower and increased Chinese involvement in the country, Revers argued that France should withdraw from the Viet Minh-held northern regions and instead focus on holding areas around the Red River Delta.

Due to gross negligence, the confidential report soon fell into the hands of the Viet Minh, who broadcast it on radio in August 1949, deeply embarrassing the French.

In France, the newly created news magazine, L'Express, which was the first one in France, also published a part of the confidential report.

Following this, a fight on Paris bus between a French soldier and Vietnamese student led to the discovery of more than 70 copies, and that the report had been shared widely around Paris' Vietnamese community.

== Generals' Affair Commission of Inquiry (January 1950) ==
In January 1950, the National Assembly of France created a Commission of Inquiry about the Generals' Affair.

== Jules Moch's trial (November 1950) ==
On November 28, 1950, the National Assembly of France brought socialist Defense Minister Jules Moch (SFIO) to court over the Generals' Affair.

== See also ==
- Henri Martin Affair
- Piastres Affair
- First Indochina War
