= French Indochinese piastre =

Official currency of French Indochina from 1885 to 1952

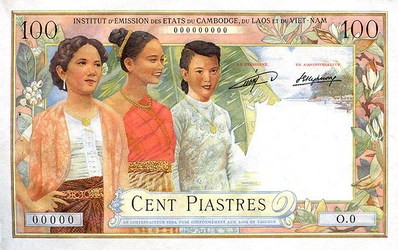
100 piastres, 1954
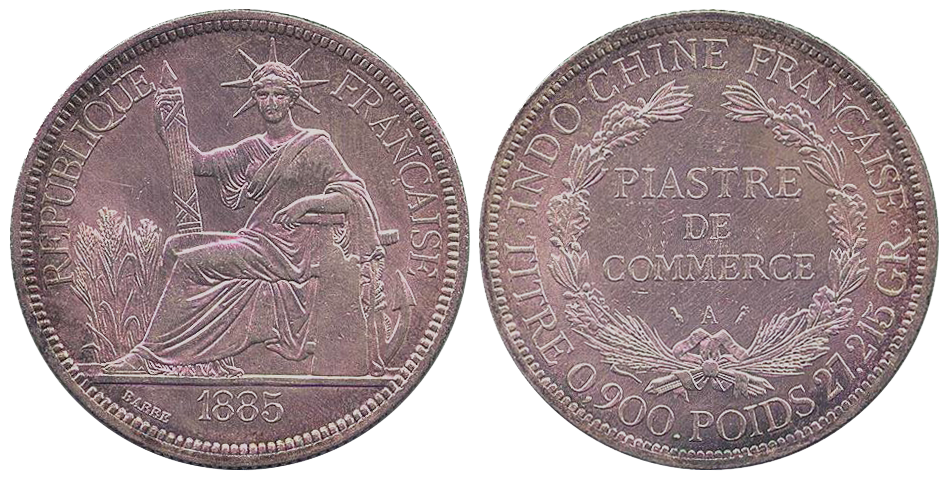
French Indochina piastre, 1885

Units of account
- Symbol: $
- Subunit
- 1/100: cent
- 1/200 ~ 1/600: sapèque

Denominations
- Banknotes: 10, 20, 50 cents, $1, $5, $10, $20, $50, $100, $200, $500
- Coins: 2 sapèques, 1/4, 1/2, 1, 5, 10, 20, 50 cents, $1

Demographics
- User(s): 1885–1887: French Cambodia; Cochinchina; Nguyen dynasty; Annam; Tonkin; 1887–1954: French Indochina; 1954–1955: Kingdom of Cambodia; State of Vietnam; 1954–1957: Kingdom of Laos

Issuance
- Central bank: Banque de l'Indochine (until 1951); Institut d'Émission des États du Cambodge, du Laos et du Viet-nam (1952-1954)
- This infobox shows the latest status before this currency was rendered obsolete.

The piastre de commerce ("trade piastre") was the currency of French Indochina between 1887 and 1954. It was first used in 1885. It was subdivided into 100 cents, each of 2~6 sapèques.

The name piastre (French pronunciation: [pjastʁ]), from Spanish pieces of eight (pesos), dates to the 16th century and has been used as the name of many different historical units of currency.

== Denominations ==
The currency of French Indochina was divided into the piastre, cent / centime, and sapèque units. One piastre equals 100 cents and one cent equals between 2 and 6 sapèques depending on the dynasty and reign era. According to that ratio, a French Indochinese piastre coin is worth from 200 to 600 traditional Vietnamese cash coins. The obverse of the banknotes and coins were inscribed in the French language, while the reverse side had inscriptions written in Traditional Chinese, Vietnamese Latin script, Lao, and Khmer scripts, but sometimes only French inscriptions were written.

== History ==
Prior to the arrival of the French in the Indochinese peninsula in the second half of the 19th century, cash coins similar to those used in the provinces of China circulated in the area that is nowadays known as Vietnam. There was also a silver milled dragon coin and associated subsidiary coinage in circulation. The Tự Đức Thông Bảo dragon coin is believed to have been in imitation of the Spanish silver dollar or Philippine peso or Mexican peso which also circulated widely in the region at that time emanating from the Philippines as part of the Spanish East Indies of the Spanish colonial empire; however, the dragon dollars were worth less because the fineness of the silver was less than that in the Spanish and Mexican dollars. In the region that is nowadays Cambodia and Laos, the Siamese coinage circulated and Cambodia had its own regional varieties of the Siamese Tical (Thai Baht).

The French began their Indo-Chinese empire in 1862 with Cochinchina which is the area around the Mekong Delta and Saigon, and which is nowadays the extreme southern part of Vietnam. This empire very quickly expanded to include Cambodia which had been a vassal state of the Kingdom of Siam. In 1875, the French introduced a Cambodian franc to Cambodia. Although these francs were minted in Belgium between 1875 and 1885, they always bore the date 1860. The French also began to introduce a subsidiary coinage in 'cents' into Cochinchina in the late 1870s. These cents were actually subsidiary coinage of the Spanish dollar unit, also known as Philippine peso or Mexican peso in the Spanish colonial empire, as opposed to being subsidiary coinage of the French franc.

In 1884, the French empire in Indo-China further expanded to incorporate Annam and Tonkin. The following year, in 1885, the French introduced a new silver piastre de commerce and associated subsidiary coinage throughout the entire Indo-Chinese colonies in order to increase monetary stability. The piastre was initially equivalent to the Spanish silver dollar or Philippine peso or Mexican peso. The piastre was therefore a direct lineal descendant of the Spanish pieces of eight that emanated from the Philippines in the Spanish East Indies after being brought to the Orient from Mexico and Peru on the Manila Galleons in the Manila-Acapulco Galleon trade of the Spanish colonial empire. It was initially on a silver standard of 1 piastre = 24.4935 grams pure silver. This was reduced to 24.3 grams in 1895.

During the first 11 years of their colonial rule, the French had minted millions of silver coins. However, because these French silver piastres were heavier than the Spanish or Philippine or Mexican reals, that already circulated in French Indochina at the time, the French made piastres were often hoarded by the local populace, especially by the highland tribes (Gresham's law). On July 8, 1895, and later again on April 14, 1898, it was decreed that new silver French Indochinese piastre coins would be minted with a lower weight, which allowed them to stay in general circulation. In 1895 the weight of the silver 1 piastre coin was reduced to 27 grams; the 50 cents to 13.5 grams; the 20 cents to 5.4 grams; and the 10 cents to 2.7 grams.

In the year 1897 the weight of the copper-alloy 1 cent was also reduced to 7.0 and 7.5 grams in 1897 and was holed. These weights and denominations of the French Indochinese piastre would continue for some time until during and after World War I when the global value of silver had become very high.

The governor of French Indochina issued a decree on 1 January 1906 that the Spanish colonial real or Philippine or Mexican real were no longer legal tender in the colony. Despite this decree, a number Spanish or Philippine or Mexican silver coins that had been cut into halves, fourths and eighths would remain in circulation. Chopmarked piastres were also officially banned from circulation, while the native Vietnamese cash coins were still considered legal tender.

French Indo-China was one of the last places to abandon the silver standard. The piastre remained on the silver standard until 1920, when due to the rise in the price of silver after the First World War, it was pegged to the French franc at a varying rate hence putting it unto a gold exchange standard.

After World War I broke out, many local and French people in French Indochina became worried that the central powers would attack the colony and mass converted their Bank of Indochina banknotes into silver coins. Following this, silver disappeared from circulation from a time.

The silver standard was restored in 1921 and maintained until 1930, when the piastre was pegged to the franc at a rate of 1 piastre = 10 francs. During the World War II Japanese occupation, an exchange rate of 0.976 piastre = 1 Japanese yen operated, with the pre-war peg to the franc restored after the war. However, in December 1945, to avoid the French franc's devaluation, the peg was changed to 1 piastre = 17 francs. This increased rate created huge financial opportunity by exchanging piastres into francs since the real value of piastres remained around 10 francs in Indochina, attracting organized crime and resulting in the Piastres Affair in 1950.

In 1946, the North Vietnamese đồng was introduced, which replaced the piastre at par. In 1952/53, the Lao kip (1952), Cambodian riel (1953), and South Vietnamese đồng (1953) were introduced at par with the piastre. Initially, the paper money bore denominations both in the local currency and the piastre, but coins were denominated in the national units since the beginning. These initially circulated alongside the old piastre currency. The peg of 1 piastre = 10 francs was restored in 1953. The dual denominated notes circulated until 1955 in South Vietnam and Cambodia, and 1957 in Laos.

== Coins ==
=== Coins issued before World War II ===
The coin was first introduced in 1880 then 1883 then in 1885 as so on. In 1885, bronze 1 cent and silver 10, 20 and 50 cents and 1 piastre coins were introduced. These were followed in 1887 by holed, bronze 2 sapèque. In 1895, the weights of the silver coins were reduced, due to the reduction in the silver peg of the currency. From 1896, the 1 cent was also a holed coin. In 1923, holed, cupro-nickel 5 cents were introduced, followed by holed, bronze 1/2 cent in 1935. In 1920, following the First World War, the 10 cent piece and 20 cent coins were debased to billon (Minority silver, 40% in this case) before switching to a 680 standard.

Coins of the French Indochinese piastre – pre-war issues
Denomination (Years of mintage)	Obverse	Reverse	Obverse	Reverse	Composition
2 sapèques (1887–1902)			Indo-Chine Française; date	大法國之安南; 當二	Copper
1/2 cent (1935–1940)			Phrygian cap; RF	Indochine Française; denomination; date	Copper
1 cent (1885–1895)			Republique Française; Lady Liberty; date	Indo-Chine Française; Poids 10 Gr.; 百分之一; denomination	Copper
1 cent (1896–1939)			Republique Française; Allegory of France; date	Indo-Chine Française; 百分之一; denomination	Copper
5 cents (1923–1939)			Marianne; two cornucopias; Republique Française; Liberté, Égalité, Fraternité	Indochine Française; denomination; date	Copper-nickel or nickel-brass
10 cents (1885–1937)			Republique Française; Lady Liberty; date	Indo-Chine Française; denomination; fineness; weight	Silver (.900 / .835 / .680)
20 cents (1885–1937)			Republique Française; Lady Liberty; date	Indo-Chine Française; denomination; fineness; weight	Silver (.900 / .835 / .680)
50 cents (1885–1936)			Republique Française; Lady Liberty; date	Indo-Chine Française; denomination; fineness; weight	Silver (.900)
1 piastre de commerce (1885–1895)			Republique Française; Lady Liberty; date	Indo-Chine Française; Piastre de Commerce; Titre 0,900. Poids 27.215 Gr.	Silver (.900)
1 piastre de commerce (1895–1928)			Republique Française; Lady Liberty; date	Indo-Chine Française; Piastre de Commerce; Titre 0,900. Poids 27 Gr.	Silver (.900)
1 piastre (1931)			Marianne; Republique Française	Indochine Française; date	Silver (.900)

=== During World War II ===
In 1939, zinc 1/2 cent and both nickel and cupro-nickel 10 and 20 cent coins were introduced. Coins in the name of the État Français were issued between 1942 and 1944 in denominations of 1/4, 1 and 5 cents. All three were holed, with the 1/4 cent in zinc and the other two in aluminium. In 1945, aluminium 10 and 20 cents were introduced, followed by unholed aluminium 5 cents and cupro-nickel 1 piastre coins.

Coins of the French Indochinese piastre – World War II issues
Denomination (Years of mintage)	Obverse	Reverse	Obverse	Reverse	Composition
1/4 cent (1942–1944)			1/4 cent	État Français, Indochine, date	Zinc
1/2 cent (1939–1940)			Phrygian cap; RF	Indochine Française; denomination; date	Zinc
1 cent (1940–1941)			Republique Française; phrygian cap; denomination	Indochine Française; denomination; date	Zinc
1 cent (1943)			Indochine; denomination	État Français, date	Aluminium
5 cents (1943)			Indochine; denomination	État Français, date	Aluminium
10 cents (1939–1941)			Republique Française; Marianne; date	Indochine Française; rice plant; denomination	Cupro-nickel
20 cents (1939–1941)			Republique Française; Marianne; date	Indochine Française; rice plant; denomination	Nickel or Cupro-nickel

=== Last issues ===
The last piastre coins were issued in the name of the "Indochinese Federation". The first Lao kip coins were dated 1952, while the first South Vietnamese đồng and Cambodian riel were dated 1953.

Coins of the French Indochinese piastre – Final issues
Denomination (Years of mintage)	Obverse	Reverse	Obverse	Reverse	Composition
5 cents (1946)			Republique Française; Marianne; date	Indochine Française; rice plant; denomination	Aluminium
10 cents (1945)			Republique Française; Marianne; date	Indochine Française; rice plant; denomination	Aluminium
20 cents (1945)			Republique Française; Marianne; date	Indochine Française; rice plant; denomination	Aluminium
50 cents (1946)			Republique Française; Lady Liberty; date	Indochine Française; Bronze de Nickel; denomination	Cupro-nickel
1 piastre (1946–1947)			Union Française; Marianne; date	Fédération Indochinoise; rice plant; denomination	Cupro-nickel

== Banknotes ==
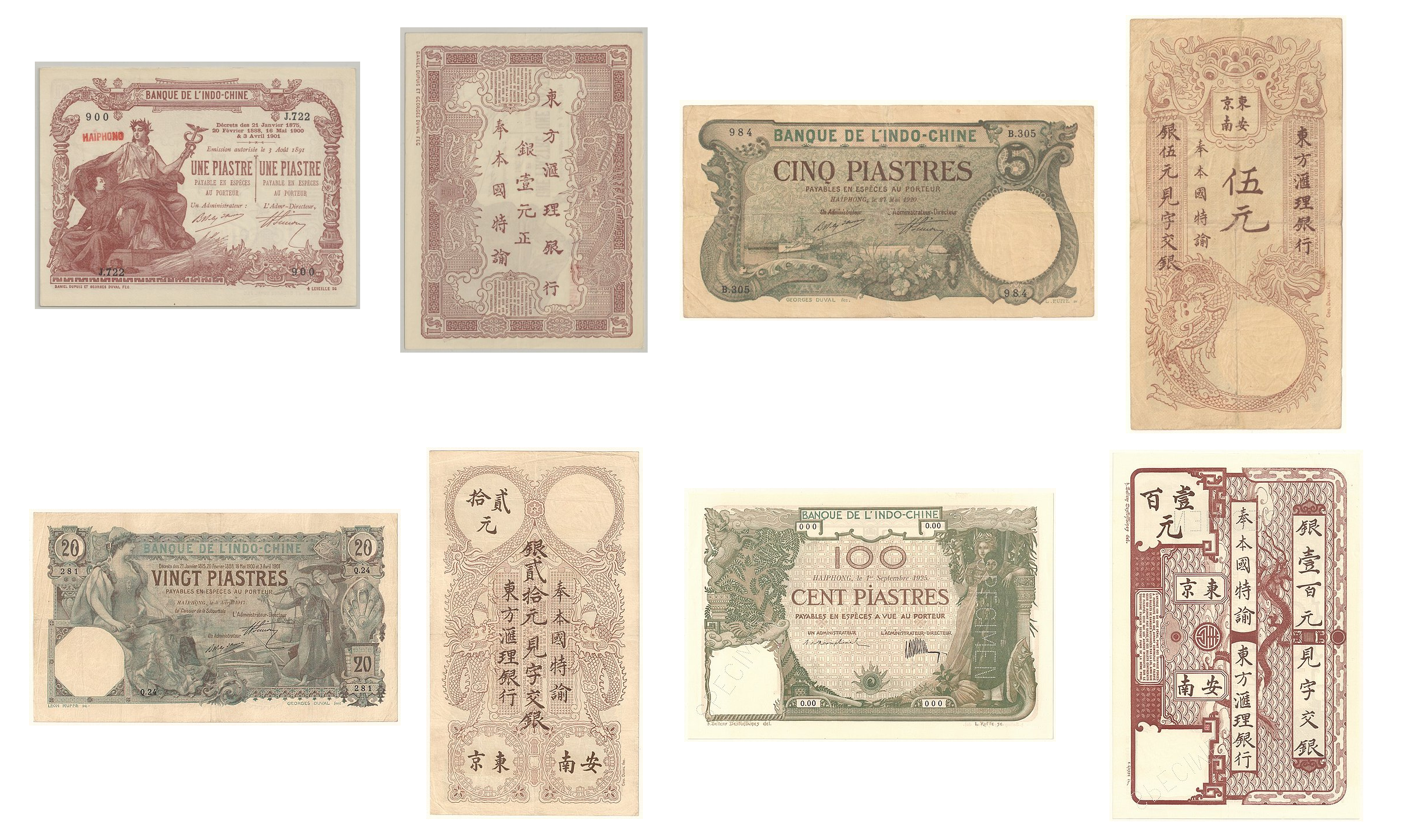
French Indochina Second series of Piastres banknotes produced by the Haiphong Branch.

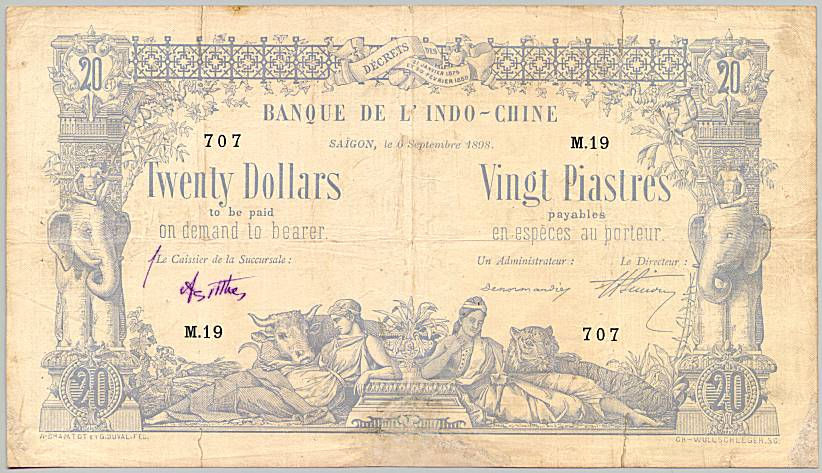
French Indochina 20 Piastres.

In 1892, the Banque de l'Indochine introduced 1 piastre notes, followed the next year by 5, 20 and 100 piastres. Between 1920 and 1922, 10, 20 and 50 cent notes were also issued. In 1939, 500 piastre notes were introduced. In 1939, the Gouvernement General de l'Indochine introduced 10, 20 and 50 cent notes, followed by 5 cents in 1942. In 1945, the Banque de l'Indochine introduced 50 piastres, followed by 10 piastres in 1947.

In 1952, the Institut d'Émission des États du Cambodge, du Laos et du Viet-nam took over the issuance of paper money. A 1 piastre note was issued that year in the name of all three states. In addition, between 1952 and 1954, notes were introduced denominated in piastre and one of three new currencies, the Cambodian riel, Lao kip and South Vietnamese đồng. For Cambodia, notes in denominations of 1, 5, 10, 100 and 200 piastres/riel were introduced. For Laos, 1, 5, 10 and 100 piastres/kip were introduced. For South Vietnam, 1, 5, 10, 100 and 200 piastres/đồng were introduced.

== See also ==
- Cochinchina Piastre
- Piastres Affair
- French Indochina
- First Indochina War
- Khải Định Thông Bảo
- Bảo Đại Thông Bảo

Preceded by: Cochinchina piastre, Cambodian franc Reason: formation of French Indochina administration, 1885; Ratio: at par (Cochinchina piastre); 1 piastre = 5.37 Cambodian francs	Currency of French Indochina (Vietnam, Laos, Cambodia); 1880 – 1949; Note: The Japanese occupied but did not issue occupation currency	Currency of State of Vietnam; 1949 – 1955; Note: transitional notes dual denominated in piastre and đồng used between 1953 and 1955. Note: the Viet Minh government issued its own separate currency	Succeeded by: North Vietnamese đồng Reason: independence Ratio: at par, or 1 đồng = 17 French francs Note: starting 1946
Preceded by: Cochinchina piastre, Cambodian franc Reason: formation of French Indochina administration, 1885; Ratio: at par (Cochinchina piastre); 1 piastre = 5.37 Cambodian francs	Currency of French Indochina (Vietnam, Laos, Cambodia); 1880 – 1949; Note: The Japanese occupied but did not issue occupation currency	Currency of State of Vietnam; 1949 – 1955; Note: transitional notes dual denominated in piastre and đồng used between 1953 and 1955. Note: the Viet Minh government issued its own separate currency	Succeeded by: South Vietnamese đồng Reason: independence Ratio: at par, or 1 đồng = 10 French francs
Preceded by: Cochinchina piastre, Cambodian franc Reason: formation of French Indochina administration, 1885; Ratio: at par (Cochinchina piastre); 1 piastre = 5.37 Cambodian francs	Currency of French Indochina (Vietnam, Laos, Cambodia); 1880 – 1949; Note: The Japanese occupied but did not issue occupation currency	Currency of Laos; 1949 – 1957; Note: transitional notes dual denominated in piastre and kip were used between 1953 and 1957	Succeeded by: Lao kip Reason: independence Ratio: at par, or 1 kip = 10 French francs
Preceded by: Cochinchina piastre, Cambodian franc Reason: formation of French Indochina administration, 1885; Ratio: at par (Cochinchina piastre); 1 piastre = 5.37 Cambodian francs	Currency of French Indochina (Vietnam, Laos, Cambodia); 1880 – 1949; Note: The Japanese occupied but did not issue occupation currency	Currency of Cambodia; 1949 – 1955; Note: transitional notes dual denominated in piastre and riel were used between 1953 and 1955	Succeeded by: Cambodian riel Reason: independence Ratio: at par, or 1 riel = 10 French francs
