= Real =

Real may refer to:

== Currencies ==
- Argentine real
- Brazilian real (R$)
- Central American Republic real
- Mexican real
- Portuguese real
- Spanish real
- Spanish colonial real
- Catalan real

== Nature and science ==
- Reality, the state of things as they exist, rather than as they may appear or may be thought to be
- Real numbers, the set of rational and irrational numbers (and opposed to imaginary numbers)
- The Real, an aspect of human psychic structure

== Sports ==
=== Africa ===
- Real Republicans FC (Accra), Ghana
- Real Republicans F.C. (Sierra Leone)

=== Central and South America ===
- Club Real Potosí, Bolivia
- Municipal Real Mamoré, Bolivia
- Associação Esportiva Real, Brazil
- Real Noroeste Capixaba Futebol Clube, Brazil
- C.D. Real Sociedad, Honduras
- Real C.D. España, Honduras
- Real Maya, Honduras
- Real Club España, Mexico
- Real Sociedad de Zacatecas, Mexico
- Real Estelí Baloncesto, Nicaragua
- Real Estelí F.C., Nicaragua
- Real Madriz, Nicaragua
- Real Garcilaso, Peru

=== Portugal ===
- Real Sport Clube
- S.C. Vila Real

=== Spain ===
- Real Madrid CF, a multi-sports club whose football section is most commonly associated with the title
- Real Aranjuez CF
- Real Ávila CF
- Real Avilés CF
- Real Balompédica Linense
- Real Betis Balompié
- Real Burgos CF
- Real Club Celta de Vigo
- Real Club Deportivo Carabanchel
- Real Club Deportivo Córdoba (defunct)
- Reial Club Deportiu Espanyol de Barcelona
- Real Club Deportivo de La Coruña
- Real Club Deportivo Mallorca
- Real Club Recreativo de Huelva
- Real Jaén CF
- Real Murcia CF
- Real Oviedo
- Real Racing Club de Santander
- Real Sociedad
- Real Sociedad Deportiva Alcalá
- Real Sociedad Gimnástica de Torrelavega
- Real Sporting de Gijón
- Real Tapia CF
- Real Titánico
- Real Unión
- Real Valladolid CF
- Real Zaragoza

=== United States ===
- Real Colorado Cougars
- Real Colorado Foxes
- Real Maryland F.C.
- Real Salt Lake, Utah
- Real San Jose, California
- Real Shore F.C., New Jersey

== People ==
- Réal (given name)
- Manuel Real (1924–2019), US judge

== Places ==
- Réal, a commune in southern France
- Real de Catorce, a village in the Mexican state of San Luis Potosí
- Real, Quezon, a municipality in the Philippines
- Real, Dume e Semelhe, a parish in Braga, Portugal
- Ciudad Real, a municipality of province of Ciudad Real in the Castile–La Mancha, Spain
- Real, Valencia, a municipality of province of Valencia in the Valencian Community
- Real County, Texas, a county in the US
- Real (Ponce), a barrio in Ponce, Puerto Rico

== Media ==
=== Albums ===
- Real (L'Arc-en-Ciel album) (2000)
- Real (Bright album) (2010)
- Real (Belinda Carlisle album) (1993)
- Real (Gorgon City EP) (2013)
- Real (IU EP) (2010)
- Real (Ivy Queen album) (2004)
- Real (Mika Nakashima album) (2013)
- Real (Ednita Nazario album) (2007)
- Real (Jodie Resther album), 2000, by Jodie Resther
- Real (Michael Sweet album) (1995)
- Real (The Word Alive album) (2014)
- Real, 2002, by Israel Houghton recording as Israel & New Breed
- Real, an unreleased 1983 album by Kirsty MacColl

=== Songs ===
- "Real" (Goo Goo Dolls song) (2008)
- "Real" (Gorgon City song) (2013)
- "Real" (Plumb song) (2004)
- "Real" (Vivid song) (2012)
- "Real" (James Wesley song) (2010)
- "Real" (freestyle), by Bizzy Bone from A Song for You
- "Real", by Kendrick Lamar from Good Kid, M.A.A.D City
- "Real", by NF from Therapy Session
- "Real", by the Verve Pipe from Villains
- "Real", by Years & Years from Communion

=== Films ===
- Real (2013 film), a Japanese film
- Real (2017 film), a South Korean film
- Real (2020 film), a British film starring Pippa Bennett-Warner

=== Television stations ===
- Real (TV channel), a Hindi entertainment channel
- Real TV (Azerbaijani TV channel), an Azerbaijani news channel
- Real TV Madagasikara, a private television channel in Madagascar

=== Other media ===
- Real (manga), a manga series by Takehiko Inoue
- Real TV, an American reality television series
- RealNetworks, an Internet media provider
- Real, a member of the band F.I.R.
- Ahmad Givens or Real, a central figure in the reality television series Real Chance of Love

== Transportation and vehicular ==
- Real (galley), the flagship of Don Juan de Austria
- Real Transportes Aéreos, a former Brazilian airline
- Real, a motorcycle constructed by Manfred Herweh
- Réseau Express de l'Aire urbaine Lyonnaise, the name of the railroads in Lyon's agglomeration

== Other uses ==
- Real (hypermarket), a European hypermarket
- Real (residence), a recreation residence in Xarq Al-Andalus
- Real Crisps, a brand of potato crisp manufactured in Newport, Wales, UK
- Real TV, an Australian theatre company
- Convento de San Felipe el Real, a former convent in Madrid
- Republican Alternative Party (Azerbaijan), also known as ReAl Party, a political party in Azerbaijan
- The Revised European-American Lymphoma classification (REAL), for diagnosis

== See also ==
- The Real (disambiguation)
- Inflation-adjusted amounts
- REAL ID Act, a U.S. federal law
- Real versus nominal value (economics)
- Reale, a surname
- Really (disambiguation)
- Rhéal, given name
- Riel (disambiguation)
- Rial (disambiguation)
- Riyal (disambiguation)
