= Riel =

Riel may refer to:

== Currency ==
- Cambodian riel, the currency of Cambodia

== Places ==
- Riel, Netherlands, a town in the Netherlands
- Riel (electoral district), a provincial electoral district in Manitoba, Canada, named after Louis Riel
- Riel, Winnipeg, Manitoba, Canada; a community committee comprising three city wards

== People and characters ==
=== People with the surname ===
- Alex Riel (1940-2024), Danish jazz and rock drummer
- André Riel (born 1989), Danish professional footballer
- Ane Riel (born 1971), Danish novelist
- Cole Riel (born 1995), American politician
- Etta Riel (1914–???), American woman who disappeared
- Heike Riel (born 1971), German nanotechnologist
- Hervé Riel, 17th century French fisherman, subject of poem by Robert Browning
- Jørn Riel (born 1931), Danish writer
- Louis Riel Sr. (1817–1864), Canadian Métis farmer, father of Louis and Sara Riel
- Louis Riel (1844–1885), Canadian Métis politician and rebel
- Maurice Riel (1922–2007), Canadian politician
- Sara Riel (1848–1883), Canadian Métis nun, sister of Louis Riel

=== People with the given name ===
- John Riel Casimero (born 1989), Filipino boxer and internet personality
- Lawrence Riel Yew (1942–1998), Canadian trapper, fisherman and politician
- Riel de Kock (born 1983), South African cricketer
- Riel Nason, Canadian novelist

=== Fictional characters ===
- Ye Ri-el, a fictional character from the Korean TV show I'm Not a Robot

== Other uses ==
- Metro Riel, Guatemala City, Guatemala; a proposed metro line
- Prix Riel (Riel Prize), Franco-Manitoban award
- Riel (film), a 1979 film about Louis Riel
- Riel House, St. Vital, Winnipeg, Manitoba, Canada; museum and former residence of Louis Riel

== See also ==
- Van Riel, Dutch surname
- Louis Riel (disambiguation)
- Riel Rebellion (disambiguation)
- Riehl (disambiguation)
- Rial (disambiguation)
- Real (disambiguation)
