= Cambodian riel =

Currency of Cambodia

Riel
រៀលកម្ពុជា (Khmer); រៀលខ្មែរ (Khmer)

ISO 4217
- Code: KHR (numeric: 116)
- Subunit: 0.01

Units of account
- Base unit: riel
- Plural: The language(s) of this currency do(es) not have a morphological plural distinction.
- Symbol: ៛
- Subunit
- 1/10: kăk (កាក់; no longer used)
- 1/100: sen (សេន; no longer used)

Denominations
- Banknotes
- Freq. used: 100៛, 200៛, 500៛, 1,000៛, 2,000៛, 5,000៛, 10,000៛, 20,000៛, 50,000៛
- Rarely used: 50៛ (no longer printed but still legal tender); 15,000៛ (commemorative); 30,000៛ (commemorative); 100,000៛ (commemorative); 200,000៛
- Coins
- Rarely used: 50៛, 100៛, 200៛, 500៛

Demographics
- Replaced: French Indochinese piastre
- User(s): Cambodia

Issuance
- Central bank: National Bank of Cambodia
- Website: www.nbc.org.kh

Valuation
- Inflation: 1.4%
- Source: The World Factbook, 2015 est.
- Pegged with: U.S. dollar at $1 ≈ 4,100 riels

Cambodian riel

Khmer name
- Khmer: រៀលកម្ពុជា UNGEGN: Rial Kampŭchia; ALA-LC: Rial Kambujā; IPA: [riəl kampuciə] រៀលខ្មែរ UNGEGN: Rial Khmae; ALA-LC: Rial Khmaer; IPA: [riəl kʰmae]

The riel (/riˈɛl/; Khmer: រៀល, romanized: rial [riəl]; sign: ៛; ISO code: KHR) is the currency of Cambodia; its base unit is the eponymous riel. There have been two distinct riels, the first issued between 1953 and May 1975. Between 1975 and 1980, the country had no monetary system due to the Khmer Rouge regime's radical policies to abolish currency. A second currency, also named riel, has been issued since 20 March 1980. Since the late 1990s, the riel has had an unofficial fixed exchange rate of 4,100:1 with the United States dollar, which is also used as a de facto currency for commercial transactions. Its subunits, the kak (1/10 riel) and the sen (1/100), are no longer in common use due to inflation.

Popular belief suggests that the name of the currency comes from the Mekong river fish riĕl ("small fish" in Khmer). It is more likely that it derives from the high-silver content Spanish-American dollar, whose value is eight reales, a coin widely used for international trade in Asia and the Americas from the 16th to 19th centuries. Thus, the riel shares the same etymology as various Middle Eastern currencies called "rial", which are all derived from the Portuguese and Spanish word real.

== Concurrent use with foreign currencies ==
In rural areas the riel is used for virtually all purchases, large and small. However, the United States dollar is also used, particularly in urban Cambodia and tourist areas. In areas near the Thai border, the Thai baht is also accepted.

Dollarization started in the 1980s and continued to the early 90s when the United Nations contributed humanitarian aid, refugees began sending remittances home, and inflation as high as 177% per year eroded confidence in the riel. From 1991 to 1993, the United Nations Transitional Authority in Cambodia stationed 22,000 personnel throughout Cambodia, whose spending represented a large part of the Cambodian economy.

While the riel remains in common use in the provinces, the major cities and tourist areas heavily use the U.S. dollar. The latter is dispensed in ATMs, accepted in virtually all purchases, and dollar quotations are required to price hotel rooms, airline tickets and significant financial transactions. The exchange rate of 4,000 riels for one dollar is widely known and employed frequently in retail trade, with riel paid out for change in fractions of a dollar.

In June 2020, the National Bank of Cambodia announced the phaseout from wide circulation of small U.S. dollar banknotes of $1, $2 and $5. This is aimed at reducing the cost of keeping the smaller U.S. notes in circulation, as well as increasing the use of the riel in lieu of these notes. No fees were to be charged to collect these small notes before 31 August 2020, but after that date banks were expected to incur costs of transporting these notes.

Current KHR exchange rates
From Google Finance:	AUD CAD CHF CNY EUR GBP HKD JPY USD JPY THB EUR
From Yahoo! Finance:	AUD CAD CHF CNY EUR GBP HKD JPY USD JPY THB EUR
From XE.com:	AUD CAD CHF CNY EUR GBP HKD JPY USD JPY THB EUR
From OANDA:	AUD CAD CHF CNY EUR GBP HKD JPY USD JPY THB EUR

== History ==
=== Cambodian tical ===
Prior to the year 1875, the tical was the currency of Cambodia as well as Siam and Laos. However, as a result of French intervention in the region, the tical in Cambodia was replaced in 1875 by the Cambodian franc.

=== Cambodian franc ===
The franc was the currency of Cambodia between 1875 and 1885. It was equal to the French franc and was similarly subdivided into 100 centimes. It replaced the tical and was replaced by the piastre.

=== French Indochinese piastre ===
The piastre was introduced in French Indochina in 1885 at par with the Spanish-American silver dollar, and was in use until 1952.

=== First riel (1953–1975) ===
In 1953, the Cambodia branch of the Institut d'Émission des États du Cambodge, du Laos et du Viet-nam issued notes dual-denominated in piastre and riel with the riel being at par with the piastre. At the same time, the two other branches of the Institut had similar arrangements with the đồng in South Vietnam and the kip in Laos. The piastre itself was derived from Spanish pieces of eight (pesos).

The riel was at first subdivided into 100 centimes (abbreviated to cent. on the coins), but this changed in 1959 to 100 sen (សេន). For the first few years, the riel and piastre circulated alongside each other. The first riel banknotes were also denominated in piastres.

- First issue, 1955–56: 1 riel, 5 riels, 10 riels, 50 riels.
- Second issue, 1956: 1 riel, 20 riels, 50 riels, 100 riels, 500 riels.
- Third issue, 1956: 100 riels, 500 riels.
- Fourth issue, 1963: 5 riels, 10 riels, 100 riels.
- Fifth issue, 1972: 100 riels*, 500 riels, 1,000 riels*, 5,000 riels*. (* Unissued.)

Coins: The 10, 20 and 50 centimes of 1953 and sen coins were minted in aluminum and were the same size as the corresponding att and xu (su) coins of Laos and South Vietnam (though without the holes in the Lao coins). A 1 riel coin about the size of a U.S. nickel was to be issued in 1970, as part of the United Nations' Food and Agriculture Organization's coin program, but was not released, perhaps due to the overthrow of the government of Norodom Sihanouk by Lon Nol.

=== Khmer Rouge (1975–1980, 1993–1999) ===
Although the Khmer Rouge printed banknotes, they were not issued as money was abolished after the Khmer Rouge took control of the country.

- Sixth issue, 1975: 0.1 riel (1 kak), 0.5 riels (5 kaks), 1 riel, 5 riels, 10 riels, 50 riels, 100 riels.

In 1993, the Khmer Rouge printed a series of coloured banknotes for limited use in territories under their control.

- Regional issue, 1993: 5 riels, 10 riels, 20 riels, 50 riels, 100 riels.

== Second riel (1980–present) ==
After the Vietnamese attacked Khmer Rouge in 1978, the riel was re-established as Cambodia's national currency on 20 March 1980, initially at a value of four riels to one U.S. dollar. It is subdivided into 10 kaks (from the Hokkien 角 kak) or 100 sens (from the French cent). Because there was no money for it to replace and a severely disrupted economy, the central government gave away the new money to the populace in order to encourage its use. Around the same time, the United Nations gave humanitarian aid to Cambodia in U.S. dollars, and placed people in Cambodia to distribute it, so the populace came to prefer the more stable U.S. dollar. As the supply of riels grew rapidly during the early 1990s, the riel devalued from four riels to the dollar in 1980 to a rate of around 4000 riels per dollar in the 2000s and around 4100 riels per dollar in the 2020s, where it has remained stable ever since.

- Seventh issue, 1979: 0.1 riel (1 kak), 0.2 riels (2 kaks), 0.5 riels (5 kaks), 1 riel, 5 riels, 10 riels, 20 riels, 50 riels.
- Eighth issue, 1987: 5 riels, 10 riels.
- Ninth issue, 1990–92: 50 riels, 100 riels, 500 riels.
- Tenth issue, 1992–93: 200 riels, 1,000 riels*, 2,000 riels*. (* Unissued.)
- Eleventh issue, 1995: 1,000 riels, 2,000 riels, 5,000 riels, 10,000 riels, 20,000 riels, 50,000 riels, 100,000 riels.
- Twelfth issue, 1995–99: 100 riels, 200 riels, 500 riels, 1,000 riels.
- Thirteenth issue, 2001–07: 50 riels, 100 riels, 500 riels, 1,000 riels, 2,000 riels, 5,000 riels, 10,000 riels, 50,000 riels.
- Fourteenth issue; 2008: 20,000 riels
- Fifteenth issue; 2012–22: 100 riels, 200 riels, 500 riels, 1,000 riels, 2,000 riels, 5,000 riels, 10,000 riels, 20,000 riels, 50,000 riels, 100,000 riels.
- Commemorative issue; 2012-2024: 1,000 riels, 2,000 riels, 15,000 riels, 30,000 riels, 200,000 riels

=== Banknotes ===
- 100 riels (2001-08-09 and 2015-01-14)
- 200 riels (1995 and 2022-11-14)
- 500 riels (2002-04-04 and 2014-01-14)
- 1,000 riels (2006-01-06 and 2017-10-25)
- 2,000 riels (2008-01-03, 2013-11-09 and 2022-11-14)
- 5,000 riels (2001-04-06 and 2017-10-25)
- 10,000 riels (2001-04-06 and 2015-05-07)
- 15,000 riels (2019)
- 20,000 riels (2008-05-12 and 2018)
- 30,000 riels (2021-10-18)
- 50,000 riels (2001-04-06 and 2014-05-06)
- 100,000 riels (1995 and 2013-05-14)
- 200,000 riels (2024-10-16)

Image		Value	Dimensions	Main Colour	Description		Date of			
Obverse	Reverse	Value	Dimensions	Main Colour	Obverse	Reverse	printing	issue	withdrawal	lapse
		50 riels	130 × 60 mm	Dark brown and tan	Banteay Srei	Dam	2002	29 August 2002		current
		100 riels	130 × 60 mm	Purple, brown and green	Independence Monument	School	2001	9 August 2001		current
		100 riels	138 × 64 mm	Orange and brown	Naga (mythical snake) head, Buddha, King Father Norodom Sihanouk as a young monk	Khmer statue, Wat Preah Keo (Silver pagoda), Buddha	2014	14 January 2015		current
		200 riels	138 × 64 mm	Gray, green and orange	Royal arms of Cambodia, Naga (mythical snake) head, King Norodom Sihamoni as a young man	Preah Thineang Chan Chhaya (Moonlight Pavilion) of the Royal Palace in Phnom Penh, Paul Ducuing's statue of King Sisowath at the National Museum of Cambodia	2022	14 November 2022		current
		500 riels	138 × 64 mm	Red and purple	Angkor Wat	Kizuna bridge over the Mekong	2002; 2004; 2014	4 April 2003		current
		500 riels	138 × 64 mm	Red, pink and gray	Naga (mythical snake) head, arms, king Norodom Sihamoni	Neak Loeung Bridge, Kizuna bridge over the Mekong River, monument, frieze	2014	14 January 2014		current
		1,000 riels	138 × 64 mm	Brown and lilac	Southern gate at Bayon	Autonomous Port of Kampong Saom (Sihanoukville)	2005; 2007; 2014	6 January 2006		current
		1,000 riels	148 × 68 mm	Lilac and dark-blue	Naga (mythical snake) head, Royal Arms of Cambodia, King Norodom Sihanouk (1922–2012)	Royal Palace throne room, swan-shaped float carrying Sihanouk's body	2012	30 January 2013		
		1,000 riels	148 × 68 mm	Purple and blue	Naga (mythical snake) head, arms, King Norodom Sihanouk	Royal palace throne room, Kinnari (half-human, half-bird)	2016	25 October 2017		current
		2,000 riels	148 × 68 mm	Green, black and yellow	Preah Vihear	Angkor Wat and rice field Worker	2007; 2015	3 January 2008		current
		2,000 riels	148 × 68 mm	Green	Naga (mythical snake) head, Royal Arms of Cambodia, King Norodom Sihanouk (1922–2012)	King Norodom Sihanouk alongside two soldiers crossing a river (December 1953); Independence Monument (Phnom Penh)	2013	8 November 2013		
		2,000 riels	148 × 68 mm	Green, orange, black, brown, and yellow	Royal arms of Cambodia, naga (mythical snake) head, King Norodom Sihamoni	Ancient stone artifact; Prasat Tao (King Lion Temple) at Sambo Prei Kuk Kampong Tom Province; chinthe (King Lion)	2022	14 November 2022		current
		5,000 riels	148 × 68 mm	Green and gray	King Norodom Sihanouk (1922–2012)	Bridge of Kampong Kdei (Siem Reap Province)	2001; 2002; 2004; 2007	6 April 2001		current
		5,000 riels	148 × 68 mm	Violet and brown	Naga (mythical snake) head, vessel, King Norodom Sihanouk wearing beret	Naga (mythical snake) head, Kampong Kdei bridge (Siemreap Province), freezes, chariot	2015	25 October 2017		current
		10,000 riels	148 × 68 mm	Violet, brown and blue	King Norodom Sihanouk (1922–2012)	Sisowath Quay	2001; 2005; 2006	6 April 2001		current
		10,000 riels	155 × 72 mm	Blue	Naga (mythical snake); King Norodom Sihamoni	Neak Pean (entwined serpents) archeological ruins of Buddhist temple on circular island in Preah Khan Baray, Angkor; stone statue of horse, Balaha	2015	15 May 2015		current
		15,000 riels	170 x 75 mm	Purple	King Norodom Sihamoni, seven-headed naga	Coronation of Norodom Sihamoni, Win-Win Memorial, three-headed elephant carrying a garuda bearing a swan	2019	7 October 2019		current
		20,000 riels	155 × 72 mm	Violet and purple	King Norodom Sihamoni	Angkor Wat, Four faces of the Bodhisattva Avalokitesvara	2008	12 May 2008		current
		20,000 riels	155 × 72 mm	Light and dark pink and gray	Naga (mythical snake), king Norodom Sihamoni	Banteay Srei Temple in Siem Reap province	2017	16 May 2018		current
		30,000 riels	170 x 75 mm	Green, brown and purple	Naga (mythical snake), king Norodom Sihanouk	King Norodom Sihanouk and Prime Minister Samdech Techo Hun Sen, Royal Palace, Eiffel Tower and Independence Monument	2021	18 October 2021		current
		50,000 riels	150 × 70 mm	Violet, brown and blue	Norodom Sihanouk	Angkor Wat, three-headed elephant	2001	6 April 2001		current
		50,000 riels	155 × 72 mm	Brown	Naga (mythical snake), King Norodom Sihanouk	Bakong Temple and sculpture of elephant at Koh Ker temple	2013	6 May 2014		current
		100,000 riels	170 × 75 mm	Green	Royal Arms of Cambodia, King Father Norodom Sihanouk, Queen Mother Norodom Monineath, Naga (mythical snake) head	King Father Norodom Sihanouk, Queen Mother Norodom Monineath and King Norodom Sihamoni, stone sculpture	2012	30 April 2013		current
		200,000 riels	170 × 76 mm	Gold	Royal Arms of Cambodia, King Norodom Sihamoni, Queen Mother Norodom Monineath, Naga (mythical snake) head	King Norodom Sihamoni Four faces of Bodhisattva Avalokitesvara (God who hears the cry of the World), Bayon temple (Angkor) Naga (mythical snake) from Wat Phnom Bridge	2024	16 October 2024		current
These images are to scale at 0.7 pixel per millimetre (18 pixel per inch). For table standards, see the banknote specification table.

=== Coins ===
The first coins were 5 sen pieces, minted in 1979 and made of aluminum. No more coins were minted until 1994, when denominations of 50, 100, 200 and 500 riels were introduced. However, these are rarely found in circulation.

Coins of the Cambodian riel
Image		Value	Diameter	Mass	Composition	Edge	Obverse	Reverse	Year of	
Obverse	Reverse	Value	Diameter	Mass	Composition	Edge	Obverse	Reverse	first minting	withdrawal
		50 riels	15.9 mm	1.6 g	Steel	Plain/Smooth	Denomination, year of minting in Buddhist and Gregorian calendar	Independence Monument in Phnom Penh	1994	
		100 riels	17.9 mm	2 g	Steel	Plain/Smooth	Denomination, year of minting in Buddhist and Gregorian calendar	Angkor Wat	1994	
		200 riels	20 mm	2.4 g	Steel	Plain/Smooth	Denomination, year of minting in Buddhist and Gregorian calendar	2 Ceremonial bowls (one above the other) Above this is symbol Om (in Khmer language) from which rays of light emitting	1994	
		500 riels	25.8 mm	6.5 g	Bi-Metallic; steel in center, brass in ring	Segmented (Plain and Reeded edges)	Denomination, year of minting in Buddhist and Gregorian calendar	Royal arms of Cambodia (Lesser version)	1994	

== Symbol ==
The symbol for the riel is defined starting in version 3.0 of the Unicode Standard, as U+17DB ៛ KHMER CURRENCY SYMBOL RIEL.

== See also ==
- Cambodian tical
- Cambodian franc
- Economy of Cambodia

First riel
Preceded by: French Indochinese piastre Location: French Indochina; Reason: independence Ratio: at par Note: piastre not used in self-declared North Vietnam since 1946	Currency of Cambodia; 1953 – 1970; Note: transitional notes dual denominated in piastre and riel were used until 1955	Currency of Khmer Republic; 1970 – 1975	Succeeded by: none Location: Kampuchea; Reason: The Khmer Rouge attempted to implement the Marxist vision of a money-less society Note: The Khmer Rouge did print a series of riel. Some sources say they were never issued. Some say they were issued one month before they were abolished.

Second riel
Preceded by: Vietnamese đồng Reason: reintroduction of a national currency Ratio: 1 riel = 3 đồng = 0.25 U.S. dollar = 1 kg rice	Currency of Cambodia; 1980 –	Succeeded by: Current
