= Rial =

Rial, riyal, or RIAL may refer to:

- Rial (surname), a surname (and list of people with the name)
- Royal Institution for the Advancement of Learning, McGill University
- Rial Racing, a former German Formula One team

== Currency ==
Various currencies named rial, riyal, riel or real:

- Iranian rial, the currency of Iran
- Omani rial, the currency of Oman
- Yemeni rial, the currency of Yemen
- Qatari riyal, the currency of Qatar
- Saudi riyal, the currency of Saudi Arabia
- Cambodian riel, the currency of Cambodia
- Moroccan rial, a former currency of Morocco
- Spanish real, a historical currency in the Spanish Empire
- Tunisian rial, a former currency of Tunisia
- Hejaz riyal, the currency of the historical Kingdom of Hejaz
- A popular nickname for the 20-piastre Egyptian coin
- A popular nickname for the 5-santimat Moroccan coin
- Alriyal Alfransi (lit. French Riyal), the Arab name for the Maria Theresa thaler

== See also ==
- Real (disambiguation)
- Riel (disambiguation)
- Rio (disambiguation)
- Ríos (disambiguation)
- Royal (disambiguation)
