= Riehl =

Riehl may refer to:

- Riehl, Cologne, a city part of Nippes, Cologne, Germany
- Riehl (surname)
- 16189 Riehl, a main-belt asteroid

== See also ==
- Riehl melanosis, a form of contact dermatitis
- Riel (disambiguation)
