= Riegle =

Riegle is a surname. Notable people with the surname include:

- Donald Riegle (1938–2026), American author, businessman, US Representative and US Senator from Michigan
- Donald W. Riegle Sr. (1917–1992), American politician, city commissioner for Flint, Michigan; father of the above
- Ed Riegle (1924–2003), Canadian professional ice hockey player and coach
- Gene Riegle (1928–2011), American harness racing driver and trainer
- Merl Riegle (1950–2015), American crossword constructor
- Roy Wilford Riegle (1896–1988), American attorney and state Representative

== See also ==
- Riegle Report, officially titled U.S. Chemical and Biological Warfare-Related Dual Use Exports to Iraq and their Possible Impact on the Health Consequences of the Gulf War
- Riegle–Neal Interstate Banking and Branching Efficiency Act of 1994 (IBBEA)
- Riel (disambiguation)
