= French protectorate of Cambodia =

1863–1953 French protectorate in southeast Asia

Kingdom of Cambodia ព្រះរាជាណាចក្រកម្ពុជា (Khmer) Preăh Réachéanachâkr Kâmpŭchéa Royaume du Cambodge (French)
- 1863–1945; 1945–1953
- Top: Flag (1863–1940); Bottom: Flag (1940–1948) Royal arms
- Anthem: នគររាជ: Nôkôr Réach; Royaume majestueux; "Majestic Kingdom"; (1941–1953); La Marseillaise
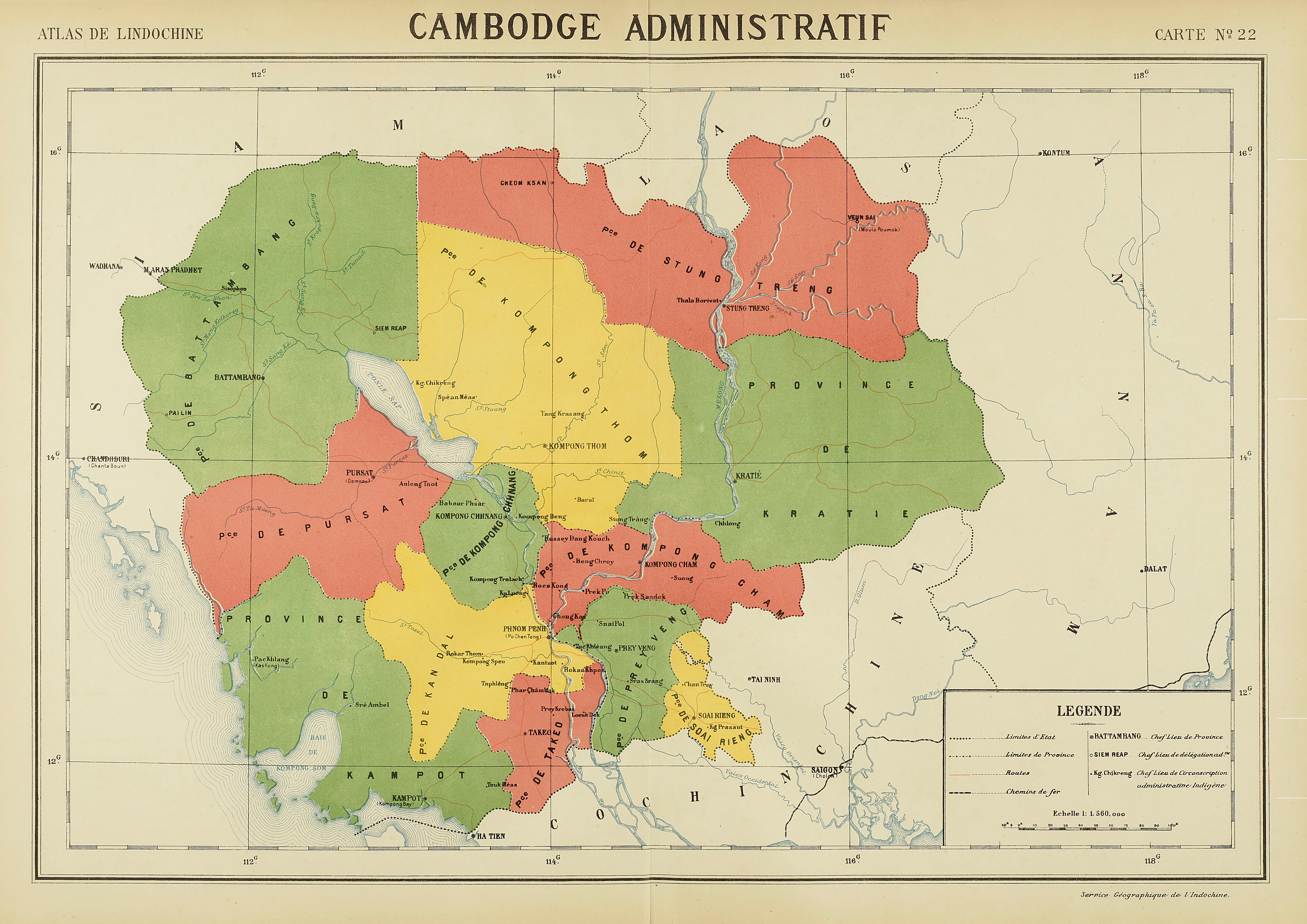
- Administrative divisions of Cambodia in 1920
- Status: French protectorate (1863–1887); Protectorate which is a constituent territory of French Indochina (1887–1945, 1945–1947); Self-ruling protectorate which is a constituent territory of French Indochina (1947–1949); Associated State which is a constituent territory of French Indochina (1949–1953)
- Capital: Oudong (1863–1866); Phnom Penh (1866–1953)
- Common languages: French (official); Khmer (common)
- Religion: Theravada Buddhism; Roman Catholicism
- Demonyms: Cambodian; Khmer
- Government: Elective monarchy
- Monarch
  - 1863–1904 (first): Norodom
  - 1904–1927: Sisowath
  - 1927–1941: Sisowath Monivong
  - 1941–1953 (last): Norodom Sihanouk
- Resident-Superior
  - 1863–1866 (first): Ernest de Lagrée (Note: As Representative)
  - 1953 (last): Jean Risterucci (Note: As High Commissioner)
- Prime Minister
  - 1945 (first): Norodom Sihanouk
  - 1953 (last): Penn Nouth
- Legislature: Parliament (1947–1953)
- History
  - Establishment: 13 August 1863
  - French Indochina: 13 October 1887
  - Franco-Siamese Treaty of 1904: 13 February 1904
  - Franco-Siamese Treaty of 1907: 13 March 1907
  - Franco-Thai War: Oct 1940 – Jan 1941
  - Japanese-backed state: 13 March 1945
  - Reestablished: 13 October 1945
  - Constitution: 13 May 1947
  - Associated state: 13 November 1949
  - Independence: 9 November 1953
  - Affirmance: 21 July 1954

Population
  - 1931: 2,803,000
- Currency: Cambodian tical (1863–1875); Cambodian franc (1875–1885); Piastre (1885–1953)
- Time zone: UTC+07:00 (ICT)
- Calling code: +855
Preceded by	Succeeded by
1863: Post-Angkor Cambodia; 1945: Kingdom of Kampuchea	1945: Kingdom of Kampuchea; 1953: Kingdom of Cambodia
- Today part of: Cambodia

The French protectorate of Cambodia (Note: Khmer: ប្រទេសកម្ពុជាក្រោមអាណាព្យាបាលបារាំង; French: Protectorat français du Cambodge) was the period of French colonial rule in Cambodia within French Indochina, a collection of Southeast Asian protectorates within the French colonial empire. The protectorate was established in 1863 when the Cambodian King Norodom requested the establishment of a French protectorate over his country, meanwhile Siam (modern Thailand) renounced suzerainty over Cambodia and officially recognised the French protectorate on Cambodia.

Cambodia was integrated into the French Indochina union in 1887 along with the French colonies and protectorates in Laos and Vietnam (Cochinchina, Annam, and Tonkin). In 1947, Cambodia was granted self-rule within the French Union, and in 1949 its status was elevated to that of an associated state. Cambodia later gained full independence under the leadership of King Sihanouk on 9 November 1953, a date celebrated as Independence Day.

== Start of French rule ==
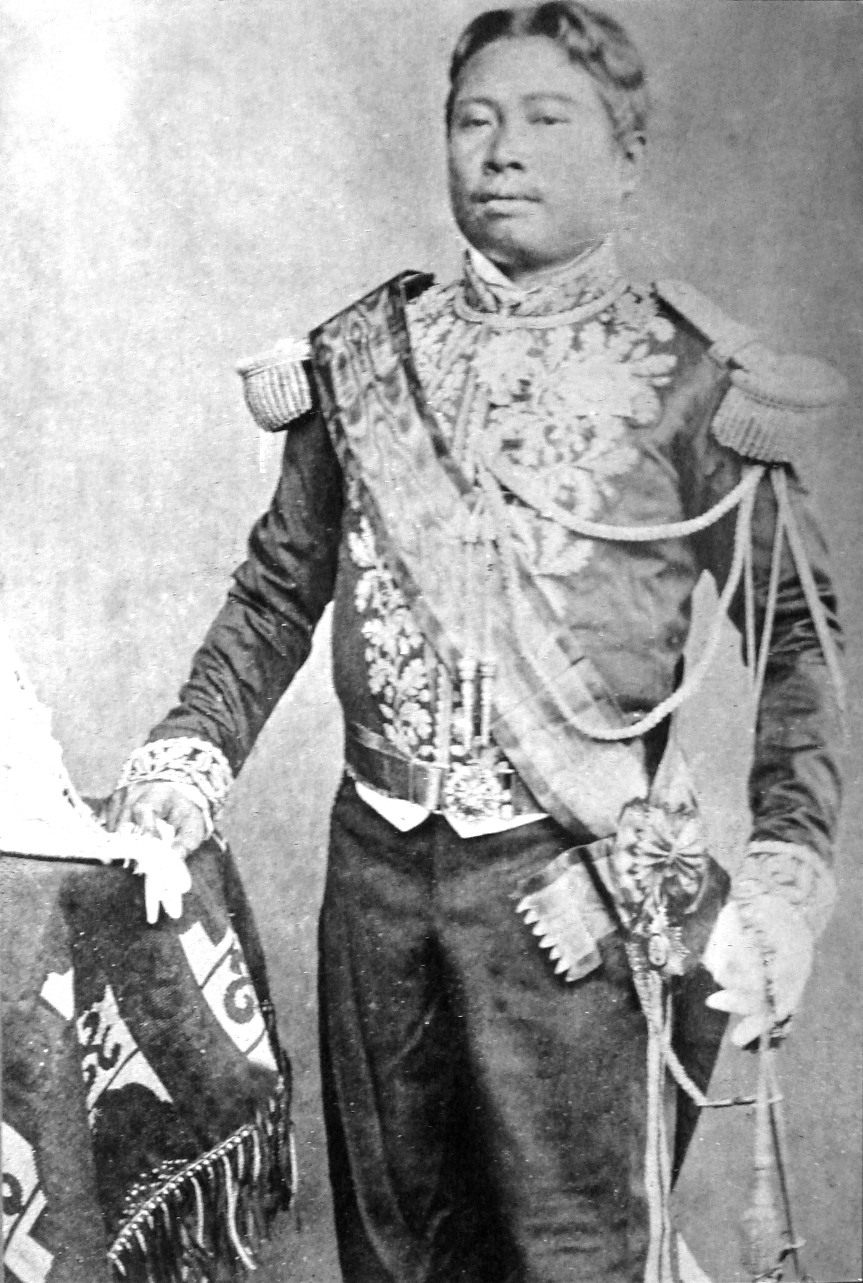
King Norodom, the monarch who initiated overtures to France to make Cambodia its protectorate in 1863 to escape Siamese pressure

During the 19th century, the kingdom of Cambodia had been reduced to a vassal state of the Kingdom of Siam (Rattanakosin rule) which had annexed its western provinces, including Angkor while growing influence from the Vietnamese Nguyễn dynasty threatened the eastern portion of the country. After the French establishment of a colony in Cochinchina (present-day southern Vietnam) in 1862, King Norodom of Cambodia requested a French protectorate over his kingdom. At the time, Pierre-Paul de La Grandière, colonial governor of Cochinchina, was carrying out plans to expand French rule over the whole of Vietnam and viewed Cambodia as a buffer between Siam and French possessions in Vietnam.

On 11 August 1863, Norodom signed a treaty acknowledging a French protectorate over his kingdom. Under the treaty, the Cambodian monarchy was allowed to remain, but power was largely vested in a resident general to be housed in Phnom Penh. France was also to be in charge of Cambodia's foreign and trade relations as well as provide military protection. Siam later recognised the protectorate after France ceded the Cambodian province of Battambang and recognised Thai control of Angkor.

== French colonial rule ==
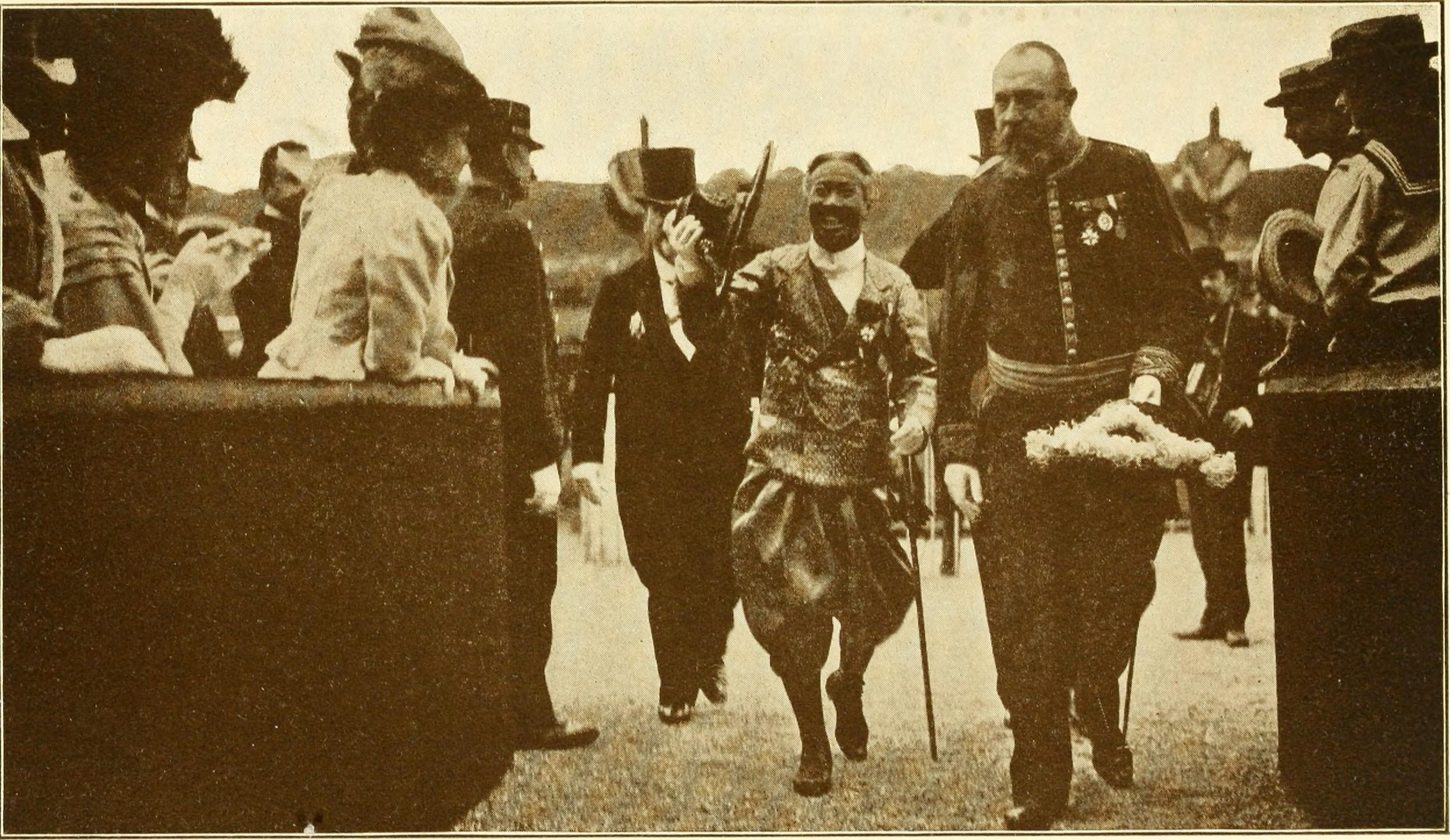
King Sisowath greeting French officials in 1911

The seat of the Governor-General for the whole of French Indochina was based in Saigon until the capital moved to Hanoi in 1902. Cambodia, being a constituent protectorate of French Indochina, was governed by the Résident Supérieur (Resident-General) for Cambodia, who was directly appointed by the Ministry of Marine and Colonies in Paris. The Resident-General was in turn assisted by Residents, or local governors, who were posted in all the provincial centres, such as, Battambang, Pursat, Oudong, and Siem Reap. Phnom Penh, the capital, was under the direct administration of the Resident-General.

=== Revolt of 1885–1887 ===
The first decades of French rule in Cambodia included numerous reforms into Cambodian politics, such as the reduction of the monarch's power and abolition of slavery. In 1884, the governor of Cochinchina, Charles Antoine François Thomson, attempted to overthrow the monarch and establish full French control over Cambodia by sending a small force to the royal palace in Phnom Penh. The movement was only slightly successful as the governor-general of French Indochina prevented full colonisation due to possible conflicts with Cambodians and the monarch's power was reduced to that of a figurehead.

In 1885, Si Votha, half brother of Norodom and contender for the throne, led a rebellion to dispose of the French-backed Norodom after coming back from exile in Siam. Gathering support from opposers of Norodom and the French, Si Votha led a rebellion that was primarily concentrated in the jungles of Cambodia and the city of Kampot where Oknha Kralahom "Kong" led the resistance. French forces later aided Norodom to defeat Si Votha under agreements that the Cambodian population be disarmed and acknowledge the resident-general as the highest power in the protectorate. Oknha Kralahom "Kong" was called back to Phnom Penh to discuss peace with King Norodom and the French officials, but was taken captive by the French army and subsequently killed, officially putting an end to the rebellion.

=== Administrative reorganisation ===
In 1896, France and the British Empire signed an accord recognizing each other's sphere of influence over Indochina, especially over Siam. Under this accord, Siam had to cede the province of Battambang back to the now French-controlled Cambodia. The accord acknowledged French control over Vietnam (including the colony of Cochinchina and the protectorates of Annam and Tonkin), Cambodia, and Laos, which was added in 1893 following French victory in the Franco-Siamese crisis and French influence over eastern Siam. The French government also later placed new administrative posts in the colony and began to develop it economically while introducing French culture and language to locals as part of an assimilation program.

In 1897, the ruling Resident-General complained to Paris that the current king of Cambodia, King Norodom was no longer fit to rule and asked for permission to assume the king's powers to collect taxes, issue decrees, and even appoint royal officials and choose crown princes. From that time, Norodom and the future kings of Cambodia were figureheads and merely were patrons of the Buddhist religion in Cambodia, though they were still viewed as god-kings by the peasant population. All other power was in the hands of the Resident-General and the colonial bureaucracy. This bureaucracy was formed mostly of French officials, and the only Asians freely permitted to participate in government were ethnic Vietnamese, who were viewed as the dominant Asians in the Indochinese Union.

In 1904, King Norodom died and rather than pass the throne on to Norodom's sons, the French passed the succession to Norodom's brother Sisowath, whose branch of the royal family was nationalistic but more cooperative with the French than Norodom's. Likewise, Norodom was viewed as responsible for the constant Cambodian revolts against French rule. Another reason was that Norodom's favourite son, whom he wanted to succeed him as king, Prince Yukanthor, had, on one of his trips to Europe, stirred up public opinion about French colonial brutalities in occupied Cambodia.

France later tightened its control over Cambodia while expanding the protectorate's territory in 1902 and 1904 through treaties with Siam, which added Preah Vihear Province and Champasak Province to Cambodia and gave France full control over the Bassac River respectively. Prior to Cambodia's historical claim over Stung Treng Province, in 1904 an exchange occurred wherein Cambodia ceded Champasak and obtained Stung Treng from French Laos. Later territorial disputes between France and Siam over Battambang and Siem Reap Provinces led to the accidental French annexation of Trat Province in 1904.

Both France and Siam agreed to do a territorial exchange based on the Franco-Siamese treaty of 1907. From this, the French gained the provinces of Battambang and Siem Reap, originally Cambodian territory until the latter part of the 18th century. The acquirement of these provinces would be the last phase of French territorial expansion in Indochina as Siam would later co-operate with the British in the region, who feared uncontrolled French expansion and control of Siam would upset the balance of powers in Indochina.

== Economy during French colonialism ==
Originally serving as a buffer territory for France between its more important Vietnamese colonies and Siam, Cambodia was not initially seen as an economically important area. The colonial government's budget originally relied largely on tax collections in Cambodia as its main source of revenue, and Cambodians paid the highest taxes per capita among the French colonies in Indochina. Poor and sometimes unstable administration in the early years of French rule in Cambodia meant infrastructure and urbanisation grew at a much lesser rate than in Vietnam and traditional social structures in villages still remained.

However, as French rule consolidated after the Franco-Siamese crisis, development slowly increased in Cambodia, where rice and pepper crops allowed for the economy to grow. To foster exports, modern agricultural methods were introduced, particularly by colonial entrepreneurs who had been granted land concessions in the Battambang province (West).

As the French automobile industry grew, rubber plantations like the ones already in Cochinchina and Annam were built and run by French investors. Economic diversification continued throughout the 1920s, when corn and cotton crops were also grown. Despite economic expansion and investment, Cambodians still continued to pay high taxes and in 1916, protests broke out demanding for tax cuts.

Infrastructure and public works were also developed under French rule, and roads and railroads were constructed in Cambodian territory. Most notably, a railway connected Phnom Penh with Battambang on the Thai border.

Industry was later developed but was primarily designed to process raw materials for local use or for export. As in nearby British Burma and British Malaya, foreigners dominated the work force of the economy due to French discrimination against the Cambodians from holding important economic positions. Many Vietnamese were recruited to work on rubber plantations and later immigrants played key roles in the colonial economy as fisherman and businessmen. Chinese Cambodians continued to be largely involved in commerce but higher positions were given to the French.

== Emergence of Khmer nationalism ==
Unlike in Vietnam, Cambodian nationalism remained relatively quiet during much of French rule mostly due to lesser education influence, which caused literacy rates to remain low and prevented nationalist movements like those taking place in Vietnam. However, among the French-educated Cambodian elite, the Western ideas of democracy and self-rule as well as French restoration of monuments such as Angkor Wat created a sense of pride and awareness of Cambodia's once powerful status in the past.

In education, there was also growing resentment among Cambodian students of the minority Vietnamese holding a more favoured status. In 1936, Son Ngoc Thanh and Pach Choeun began publishing Nagaravatta (Notre cité) as a French language anti-colonial and at times, anti-Vietnamese newspaper. Minor independence movements, especially the Khmer Issarak, began to develop in 1940 among Cambodians in Thailand, who feared that their actions would have led to punishment if they had operated in their homeland.

== World War II in Cambodia ==
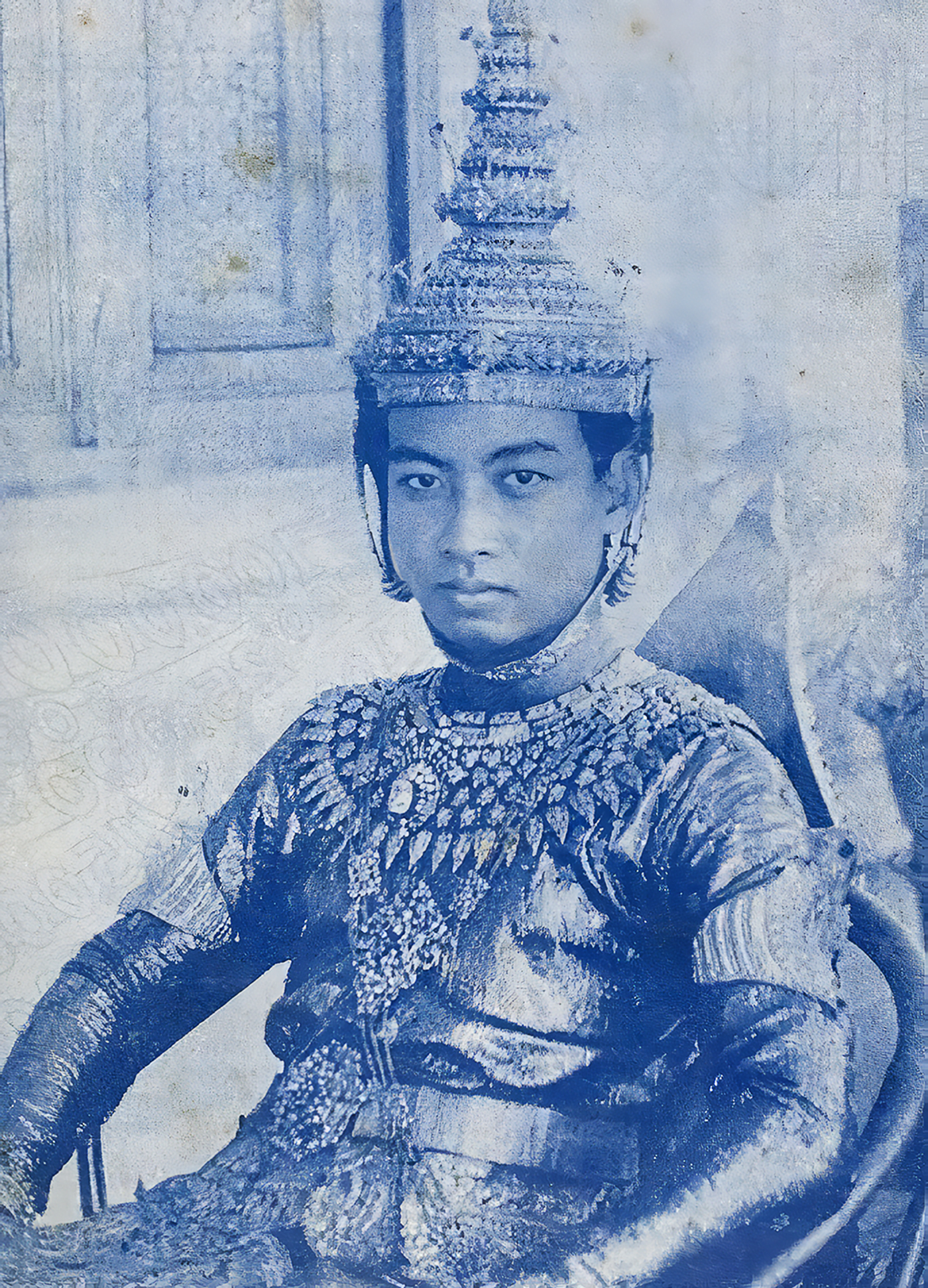
The coronation of Norodom Sihanouk in 1941

After the Fall of France in 1940, Cambodia and the rest of French Indochina were ruled by the Axis-puppet Vichy France government and despite an invasion of French Indochina, Japan allowed French colonial officials to remain in their colonies under Japanese supervision. In December 1940, the French-Thai War erupted and despite French resistance against the Japanese backed Thai forces, Japan compelled French authorities to cede Battambang, Sisophon, Siem Reap (excluding Siem Reap town) and Preah Vihear provinces to Thailand.

The Empire of Japan in 1942

Japanese calls of "Asia for the Asiatics" found a receptive audience among Cambodian nationalists, although Tokyo's policy in Indochina was to leave the colonial government nominally in charge. When a prominent, politically active Buddhist monk, Hem Chieu, was arrested and unceremoniously defrocked by the French authorities in July 1942, the editors of Nagaravatta led a demonstration demanding his release. They, as well as other nationalists, apparently overestimated the Japanese willingness to back them, for the Vichy authorities quickly arrested the demonstrators and gave Pach Choeun, one of the Nagaravatta editors, a life sentence. The other editor, Son Ngoc Thanh, escaped from Phnom Penh to Tokyo.

The subject of European colonies in Asia was among those discussed during the war by the Allied leaders of the Big Three, Franklin D. Roosevelt, Stalin, and Churchill at the three summit meetings – Cairo Conference, Tehran Conference and Yalta Conference. With regard to the largest colony of India, Roosevelt pressed very strongly for a declaration of grant of independence by war's end, a pressure doggedly resisted by Churchill.

In regards to non-British colonies in Asia, Roosevelt and Stalin had decided in Tehran that the French and the Dutch would not return to Asia after the war. Roosevelt's untimely death before the war's end, was followed by developments very different from what Roosevelt had envisaged. The British backed the return of French and Dutch rule in Asia and organised dispatches of Indian soldiers under British command for this purpose.

In an effort to enlist local support in the final months of the war, the Japanese dissolved the French colonial administration on 9 March 1945, and urged Cambodia to declare its independence within the Greater East Asia Co-Prosperity Sphere. Four days later, King Sihanouk decreed an independent Kampuchea (the original Khmer pronunciation of Cambodia). Son Ngoc Thanh returned from Tokyo in May, and was appointed foreign minister.

On 15 August 1945, the day Japan surrendered, a new government was established with Son Ngoc Thanh acting as prime minister. When an Allied force occupied Phnom Penh in October, Thanh was arrested for collaboration with the Japanese and was sent into exile in France to remain under house arrest. Some of his supporters went to north-western Cambodia, then still under Thai control, where they banded together as one faction in the Khmer Issarak movement.

== Struggle for Khmer unity ==
Cambodia's situation at the end of the war was chaotic. The Free French, under General Charles de Gaulle, were determined to recover Indochina, though they offered Cambodia and the other Indochinese protectorates a carefully circumscribed measure of self-government. Convinced that they had a "civilizing mission," they envisioned Indochina's participation in a French Union of former colonies that shared the common experience of French culture. Neither the urban professional elites nor the common people, however, were attracted by this arrangement. For Cambodians of practically all walks of life, the brief period of independence, from March to October 1945, had been enjoyable. The lassitude of the Khmer was a thing of the past.

In Phnom Penh, Sihanouk, acting as head of state, was placed in a delicate position of negotiating with the French for full independence while trying to neutralise party politicians and supporters of the Khmer Issarak and Viet Minh who considered him a French collaborator. During the tumultuous period between 1946 and 1953, Sihanouk displayed the remarkable aptitude for political survival that sustained him before and after his fall from power in March 1970. The Khmer Issarak was an extremely heterogeneous guerrilla movement, operating in the border areas.

The group included indigenous leftists, Vietnamese leftists, anti-monarchical nationalists (Khmer Serei) loyal to Son Ngoc Thanh, and plain bandits taking advantage of the chaos to terrorise villagers. Though their fortunes rose and fell during the immediate postwar period (a major blow was the overthrow of a left-wing friendly government in Bangkok in 1947), by 1954 the Khmer Issarak operating with the Viet Minh by some estimates controlled as much as 50 percent of Cambodia's territory.

In 1946, France allowed the Cambodians to form political parties and to hold elections for a Consultative Assembly that would advise the monarch on drafting the country's constitution. The two major parties were both headed by royal princes. The Democratic Party, led by Prince Sisowath Yuthevong, espoused immediate independence, democratic reforms, and parliamentary government. Its supporters were teachers, civil servants, politically active members of the Buddhist clergy, and others whose opinions had been greatly influenced by the nationalistic appeals of Nagaravatta before it had been closed down by the French in 1942.

Many Democrats sympathised with the violent methods of the Khmer Issarak. The Liberal Party, led by Prince Norodom Norindeth, represented the interests of the old rural elites, including large landowners. They preferred continuing some form of the colonial relationship with France, and advocated gradual democratic reform. In the Consultative Assembly election held in September 1946, the Democrats won 50 of 67 seats.

With a solid majority in the assembly, the Democrats drafted a constitution modelled on that of the French Fourth Republic. Power was concentrated in the hands of a popularly elected National Assembly. The king reluctantly proclaimed the new constitution on 6 May 1947. While it recognised him as the "spiritual head of the state," it reduced him to the status of a constitutional monarch, and it left unclear the extent to which he could play an active role in the politics of the nation. Sihanouk would turn this ambiguity to his advantage in later years, however.

In the December 1947 elections for the National Assembly, the Democrats again won a large majority. Despite this, dissension within the party was rampant. Its founder, Sisowath Yuthevong, had died and no clear leader had emerged to succeed him. During the period 1948 to 1949, the Democrats appeared united only in their opposition to legislation sponsored by the king or his appointees. A major issue was the king's receptivity to independence within the French Union, proposed in a draft treaty offered by the French in late 1948. Following dissolution of the National Assembly in September 1949, agreement on the pact was reached through an exchange of letters between King Sihanouk and the French government. It went into effect two months later, though National Assembly ratification of the treaty was never secured.

The treaty granted Cambodia what Sihanouk called "fifty percent independence": by it, the colonial relationship was formally ended, and the Cambodians were given control of most administrative functions. Cambodian armed forces were granted freedom of action within a self-governing autonomous zone comprising Battambang and Siemreab provinces, which had been recovered from Thailand after World War II, but which the French, hard-pressed elsewhere, did not have the resources to control. Cambodia was still required to co-ordinate foreign policy matters with the High Council of the French Union, however, and France retained a significant measure of control over the judicial system, finances, and customs.

Control of wartime military operations outside the autonomous zone remained in French hands. France was also permitted to maintain military bases on Cambodian territory. In 1950 Cambodia was accorded diplomatic recognition by the United States and by most non-communist powers, but in Asia only Thailand and South Korea extended recognition.

The Democrats won a majority in the second National Assembly election in September 1951, and they continued their policy of opposing the king on practically all fronts. In an effort to win greater popular approval, Sihanouk asked the French to release nationalist Son Ngoc Thanh from exile and to allow him to return to his country. He made a triumphant entry into Phnom Penh on 29 October 1951. It was not long, however, before he began demanding withdrawal of French troops from Cambodia.

He reiterated this demand in early 1952 in Khmer Krok (Khmer Awake!) a weekly newspaper that he had founded. The newspaper was forced to cease publication in March, and Son Ngoc Thanh fled the capital with a few armed followers to join the Khmer Issarak. Branded alternately a communist and an agent of the United States Central Intelligence Agency (CIA) by Sihanouk, he remained in exile until Lon Nol established the Khmer Republic in 1970.

== Campaign for independence ==
In June 1952, Sihanouk announced the dismissal of his cabinet, suspended the constitution, and assumed control of the government as prime minister. Then, without clear constitutional sanction, he dissolved the National Assembly and proclaimed martial law in January 1953. Sihanouk exercised direct rule for almost three years, from June 1952 until February 1955. After dissolution of the assembly, he created an Advisory Council to supplant the legislature and appointed his father, Norodom Suramarit, as regent.

In March 1953, Sihanouk went to France. Ostensibly, he was travelling for his health; actually, he was mounting an intensive campaign to persuade the French government to grant complete independence. The climate of opinion in Cambodia at the time was such that if he did not achieve full independence quickly, the people were likely to turn to Son Ngoc Thanh and the Khmer Issarak, who were fully committed to attaining that goal. At meetings with the French president and with other high officials, Sihanouk was suggested as being unduly "alarmist" about internal political conditions. The French also made the thinly veiled threat that, if he continued to be uncooperative, they might replace him. The trip appeared to be a failure, but on his way home by way of the United States, Canada, and Japan, Sihanouk publicised Cambodia's plight in the media.

To further dramatise his "royal crusade for independence," Sihanouk declared that he would not return until the French gave assurances that full independence would be granted. He then left Phnom Penh in June to go into self-imposed exile in Thailand. Unwelcome in Bangkok, he moved to his royal villa near the ruins of Angkor in Siemreab Province. Siemreab, part of the autonomous military zone established in 1949, was commanded by Lieutenant Colonel Lon Nol, formerly a right-wing politician who was becoming a prominent, and in time would be an indispensable Sihanouk ally within the military. From his Siemreab base, the king and Lon Nol contemplated plans for resistance if the French did not meet their terms.

Sihanouk was making a high-stakes gamble, for the French could easily have replaced him with a more pliable monarch; however, the military situation was deteriorating throughout Indochina, and the French government, on 3 July 1953, declared itself ready to grant full independence to the three states of Cambodia, Vietnam, and Laos. Sihanouk insisted on his own terms, which included full control of national defence, the police, the courts, and financial matters.

The French yielded: the police and the judiciary were transferred to Cambodian control at the end of August, and in October the country assumed full command of its military forces. King Sihanouk, now a hero in the eyes of his people, returned to Phnom Penh in triumph and independence day was celebrated on 9 November 1953. Control of residual matters affecting sovereignty, such as financial and budgetary affairs, passed to the new Cambodian state in 1954.
