= Reale =

Reale is a surname. Notable people with the surname include:

- Damien Reale (born 1981), Irish hurler
- David Reale (born 1984), Canadian actor
- Enzo Reale (born 1991), French footballer
- Federigo Reale, 19th-century Italian painter
- Giovanni Reale (1931–2014), Italian historian of philosophy
- Liam Reale (born 1983), Irish middle-distance runner
- Mark Reale (1955–2012), American guitarist
- Michele Reale (born 1971), Italian golfer
- Michelle Reale, American poet, academic and ethnographer
- Miguel Reale (1910–2006), Brazilian jurist, philosopher, academic, politician and poet
- Oronzo Reale (1902–1988), Italian politician
- Robert Reale (born 1956), American composer
- Willie Reale, American writer

== See also ==
- Real (disambiguation)
