= The Real (disambiguation) =

The Real is a term in Continental Philosophy.

The Real may also refer to:

== Arts ==
- "The Real", a song by Tracy Bonham on the album The Liverpool Sessions
- "The Real" (The Boondocks), an episode of the animated television show
- The Real (talk show), a daytime talk show

== See also ==
- Real (disambiguation)
- The RealReal, a marketplace for authenticated luxury consignments
