= List of administrators of the French protectorate of Cambodia =

This article lists the administrators of the French protectorate of Cambodia, and also encompass the Japanese occupation of Cambodia.

(Dates in italics indicate de facto continuation of office)

Tenure	Portrait	Incumbent	Notes
French suzerainty
April 1863 to July 1866		Ernest Marc Louis de Gonzague Doudart de Lagrée, Representative	
July 1866 to 20 February 1868		Armand Pottier, Representative	1st time
20 February 1868 to 10 March 1870		Jean Moura, Representative	1st time
10 March 1870 to 11 November 1870		Armand Pottier, Acting Representative	2nd time
11 November 1870 to 1 January 1871		Jules Marcel Brossard de Corbigny, Acting Representative	
1 January 1871 to 1 May 1876		Jean Moura, Representative	2nd time
1 May 1876 to 9 November 1876		Paul-Louis-Félix Philastre, Acting Representative	
9 November 1876 to 6 January 1879		Jean Moura, Representative	3rd time
6 January 1879 to 10 May 1881		Étienne François Aymonier, Acting Representative	
10 May 1881 to 1 November 1884		Paul Julien Auguste Fourès, Representative	
1 November 1884 to 12 August 1885		Paul Julien Auguste Fourès, Acting Resident-General	
12 August 1885 to 16 October 1885		Jules Victor Renauld, Acting Resident-General	
16 October 1885 to 17 May 1886		Pierre de Badens, Provisional Resident-General	
17 May 1886 to 28 October 1887		Georges Jules Piquet, Resident-General	
4 November 1887 to 10 May 1889		Louis Eugène Palasne de Champeaux, Acting Resident-General	
10 May 1889 to 4 July 1889		Pascal Orsini, Acting Resident-General	
4 July 1889 to 24 January 1894		Albert Louis Huyn de Vernéville, Resident-Superior	1st time
24 January 1894 to 4 August 1894		Flore Léonce Marquant, Acting Resident-Superior	
4 August 1894 to 14 May 1897		Albert Louis Huyn de Vernéville, Resident-Superior	2nd time
14 May 1897 to 16 January 1900		Antoine Étienne Alexandre Ducos, Resident-Superior	
16 January 1900 to 3 June 1901		Louis Paul Luce, Acting Resident-Superior	1st time
3 June 1901 to 17 July 1902		Léon Jules Paul Boulloche, Resident-Superior	
17 July 1902 to 26 October 1902		Charles Pierre Pallier, Acting Resident-Superior	
26 October 1902 to 25 September 1904		Henri Félix de Lamothe, Resident-Superior	
25 September 1904 to 16 October 1905		Louis Jules Morel, Resident-Superior	
16 October 1905 to 16 December 1905		Olivier Charles Arthur de Lalande de Calan, Acting Resident-Superior	
29 December 1905 to 26 July 1911		Louis Paul Luce, Resident-Superior	2nd time
26 July 1911 to 26 March 1914		Ernest Amédée Antoine Georges Outrey, Resident-Superior	Acting to 8 October 1911
26 March 1914 to 25 July 1914		François Xavier Tessarech, Acting Resident-Superior	
25 July 1914 to 22 October 1914		Joseph Maurice Le Gallen, Acting Resident-Superior	
22 October 1914 to 20 January 1927		François Marius Baudoin, Resident-Superior	
15 April 1920 to 6 December 1920		Georges Maspero, Acting Resident-Superior	Acting for Baudoin
6 December 1920 to 21 February 1921		Hector Clair Joseph Henri Létang, Acting Resident-Superior	Acting for Baudoin
10 April 1922 to 8 May 1924		Victor Édouard Marie L'Helgoualc'h, Acting Resident-Superior	Acting for Baudoin
20 January 1927 to 1 January 1929		Aristide Eugène Le Fol, Resident-Superior	
1 January 1929 to 12 January 1929		Achille Louis Auguste Silvestre, Acting Resident-Superior	1st time
12 January 1929 to 4 March 1932		Fernand Marie Joseph Antoine Lavit, Resident-Superior	
4 March 1932 to 15 January 1935		Achille Louis Auguste Silvestre, Resident-Superior	2nd time, acting to 7 December 1932
15 January 1935 to 12 December 1936		Henri Louis Marie Richomme, Acting Resident-Superior	
12 December 1936 to 29 December 1941		Léon Emmanuel Thibaudeau, Resident-Superior	Acting to 16 June 1937
29 December 1941 to 2 March 1943		Jean Delens, Acting Resident-Superior	
2 March 1943 to November 1944		Georges Armand Léon Gautier, Resident-Superior	
November 1944 to 9 March 1945		André Joseph Berjoan, Acting Resident-General	1st time, Japanese prisoner 9 March 1945 – August 1945
Japanese suzerainty
9 March 1945 to 1945		Takanobu Manaki, Commander	
9 March 1945 to 17 August 1945		Kanichiro Kubota, Supreme Adviser	
Allied control
8 October 1945 to 1946		Edward Dymoke Murray, Military Commander	From United Kingdom
French suzerainty
August 1945 to 15 October 1945		André Joseph Berjoan, Acting Resident-Superior	2nd time
15 October 1945 to 10 April 1946		Paul Huard, Commissioner	
10 April 1946 to 20 May 1947		Romain Victor Joseph Pénavaire, Commissioner	Acting to 26 July 1946
20 May 1947 to 20 October 1948		Léon Pignon, Commissioner	
20 October 1948 to 26 February 1949		Lucien Vincent Loubet, Acting Commissioner	
26 February 1949 to 29 October 1951		Jean Léon François Marie de Raymond, Commissioner	
29 October 1951 to 16 May 1952		Yves Jean Digo, Commissioner	
16 May 1952 to 27 April 1953		Jean Risterucci, Commissioner	
27 April 1953 to 9 November 1953		Jean Risterucci, High Commissioner	

== See also ==
- History of Cambodia
