= Really =

Really may refer to:

- Really (album), by JJ Cale
- Really (TV channel)
- Really, a 2006 film starring Philip Arditti
- Really, a 2000 album by David Huff
- "Really", a 2018 song by Blackpink from Square Up

== See also ==
- Real (disambiguation)
