= Royal Palace, Valencia =

Former royal residence in Spain

Coordinates: 39.480°N 0.368°W

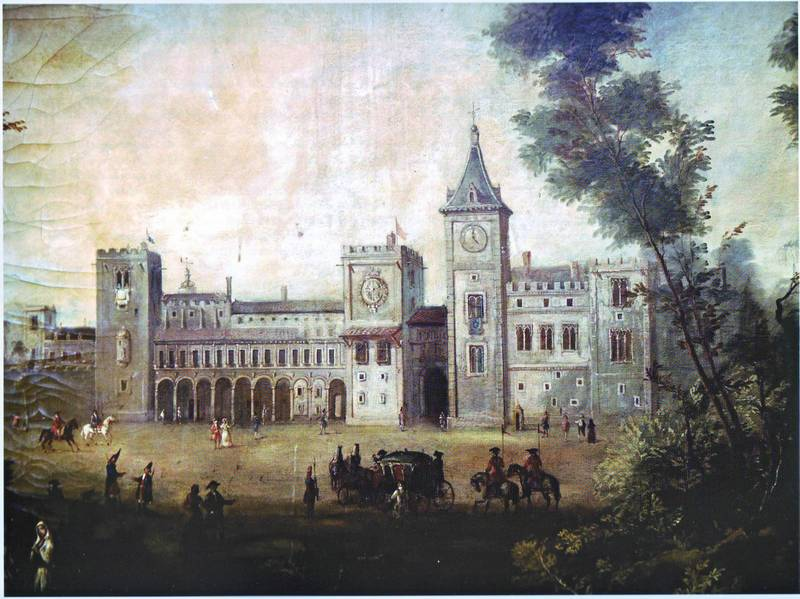
Anonymous painting, early 19th century.

The now demolished Real Palace or Royal Palace (in Valencian, Palau del Real; in Spanish, Palacio del Real) was the former residence of the kings of Valencia in the "Cap i Casal" (head and home) of the kingdom, as the city of Valencia was then called. It was on the left bank of the Turia River, where nowadays the Jardines del Real are. It was also known as "300 keys palace" in reference to the number of rooms it had at its height.

From 11th to 19th centuries it was royal seat whether for the kings of the Taifa of Valencia or the monarchs of the Crown of Aragon, the Habsburgs and the Bourbons, while it was less appreciated by the latter.

Late-19th century Valencian political Teodoro Llorente wrote: "What happened to you, Palacio del Real? noble mansion of the Valencian monarchs, centre and symbol of our ancient and glorious kingdom (...) All disappeared with the institutions that you represented, the illustrious autonomy of that kingdom that you were head..."

== Origins ==
It was originally constructed in the 11th century by the king Abd al-Aziz al-Mansur as an almúnia or recreation residence on the outskirts of the city. In Xarq al-Andalus these rural residences of the urban oligarchy, located around the cities, were known as real (from Arabic riyad, garden), which must not be confused with the rafals, which were estates for agrarian production. Thereupon, the Real Palace name arises from the fact that it was one of these almúnies, not because it was a royal residence. The Arabist Henri Péres, in his book Esplendor de Al-Andalus, talks about the beauty and grandeur of the palace, which "included a big garden planted with fruit trees and flowers and a river that crossed it, and the palace is located in the middle, with richly decorated pavilions, which gaped open to the garden".

In 1364, in the course of the war with Castile, the troops of Peter the Cruel burned it down and looted it.

== Expansion ==
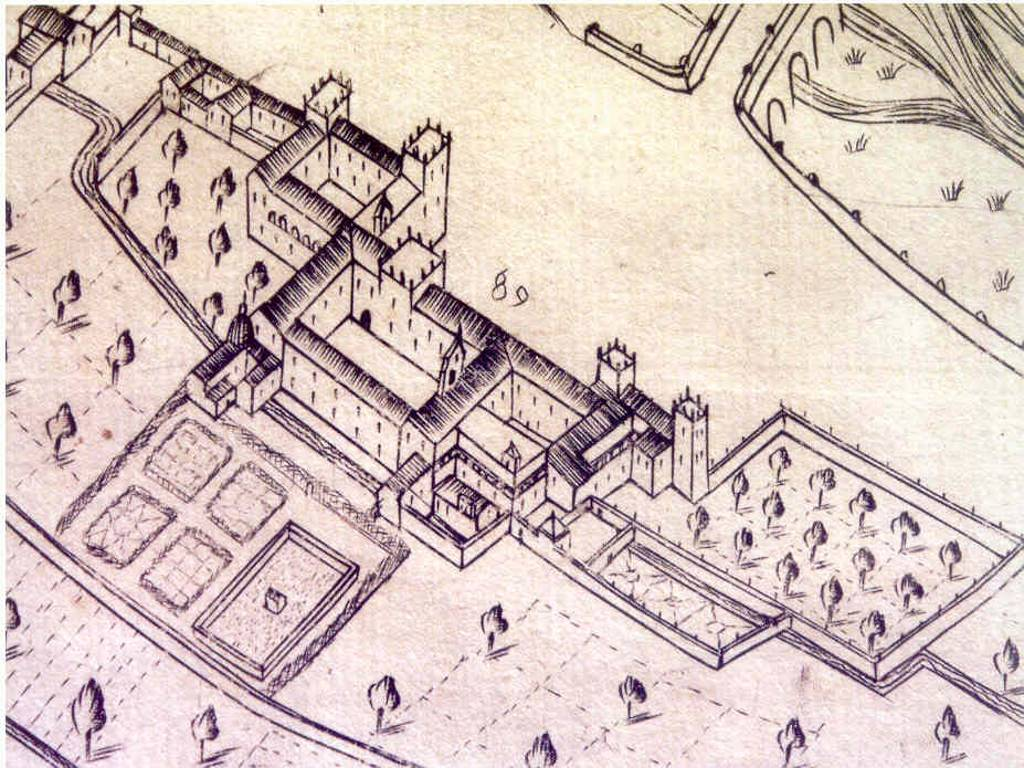
The palace in 1609

Afterwards, Peter the Ceremonious practically rebuilt it as the residence of the Aragonese monarchs almost entirely, incorporating some very partial remains of the old architecture, and broadened the gardens in the 14th century, intending to build a true royal palace. John I also enlarged it, as did Alfonso the Magnanimous, who, during the few years he resided in Valencia before conquering Naples, consolidated it as a royal residence and made considerable expenses to turn it into one of the best royal palaces in the Crown of Aragon. His wife, Queen Maria, for whom it was one of her most favoured residences, lived there permanently with her court. From there she governed the peninsular kingdoms of the Crown of Aragon while her husband was away. Inventories of that time indicate that it was a sumptuously decorated palace, with abundant tapestries, paintings and rich furniture. Ferdinand the Catholic, Germaine of Foix and Ferdinand, Duke of Calabria also improved the facilities.

The palace was composed of two attached bodies, called Real Vell (Old Real) and Real Nou (New Real). The old Arab building had a central courtyard and four towers. There were two patios in the new part. The main halls, where audiences, parties and receptions were held, were on the first floor. There were gardens with ponds and exotic plants brought on purpose from America, and a menagerie with lions, bears, deer, pheasants, peacocks and other animals. Some of those gardens are the current Viveros garden.

In the early modern period (16th and 17th centuries) it was the residence of the viceroys of Valencia, and also headquarters of the Cancelleria Reial (Royal Chancery) of the Kingdom of Valencia archive, created by Alfonso the Magnanimous, and originating part of the current Archive of the Kingdom of Valencia. Subsequently, in the 18th century, after the Nueva Planta decrees, it also served as the residence of the captain generals.

Thereupon it underwent major work; the inner and external structure was modified, the Gothic windows that gave it a medieval look were removed, and an arched gallery was added on the main façade. Captain general of Valencia from 1721 to 1737, the nobleman of Italian origin Luigi Reggio, 4th prince of Campofiorito, took the initiative to organise in the Real Gardens the first opera performances ever played in Valencia.

== From demolition to present ==
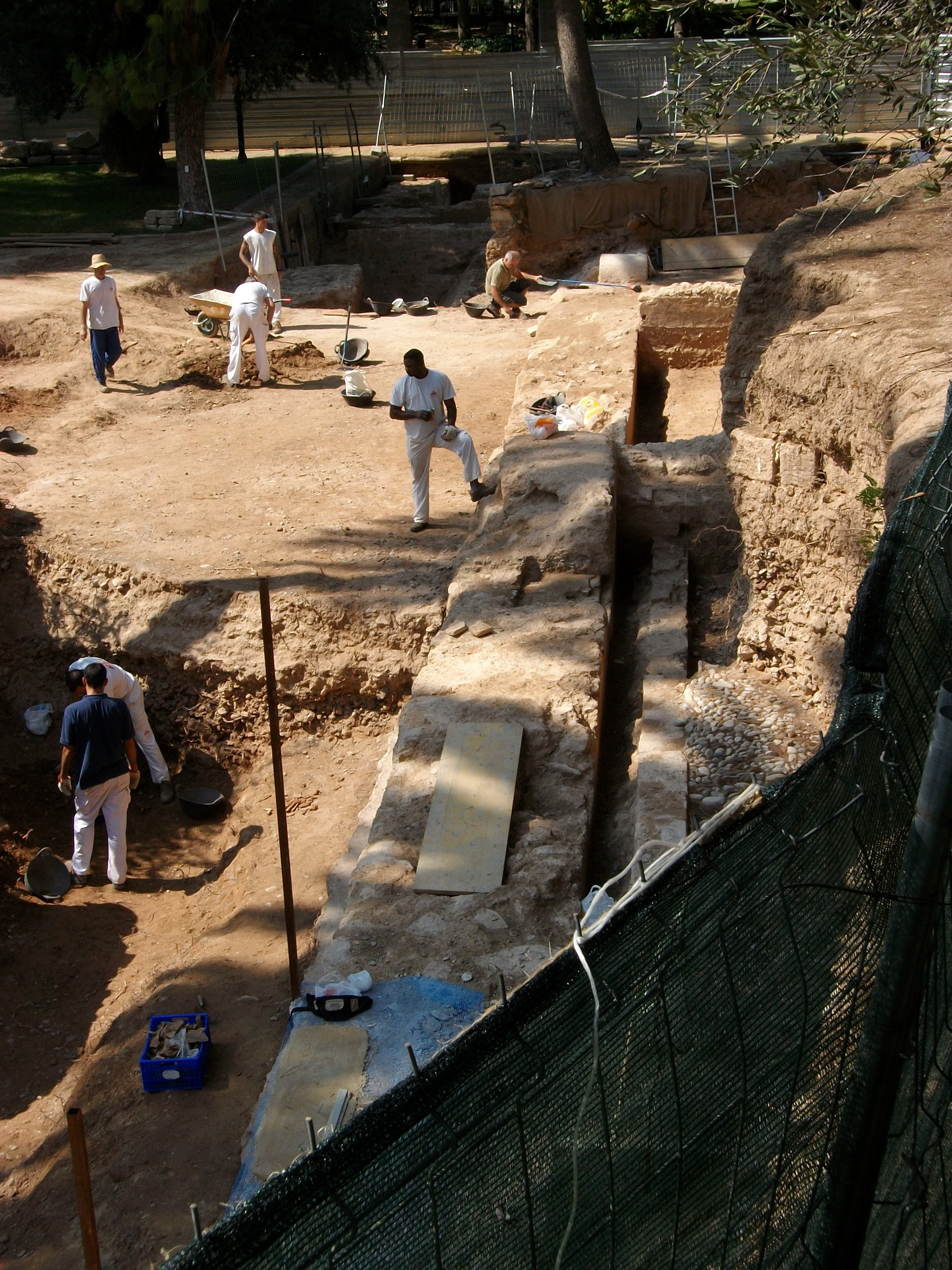
Excavations in 2009.

In 1810, during the Peninsular War, in order to deny the palace to the Napoleonic troops, the Valencians themselves decided to demolish it. The demolition was due to a combination of factors: a poor military strategy, the economic needs of the Junta de Defensa and the perception that the palace represented the past. Only fragments of the coffered ceiling survived, preserved at the Arxiu del Regne. After the demolition, a small mound in the Jardines del Real, known as montañeta del General Elio, was said to consist of the palace's rubble.

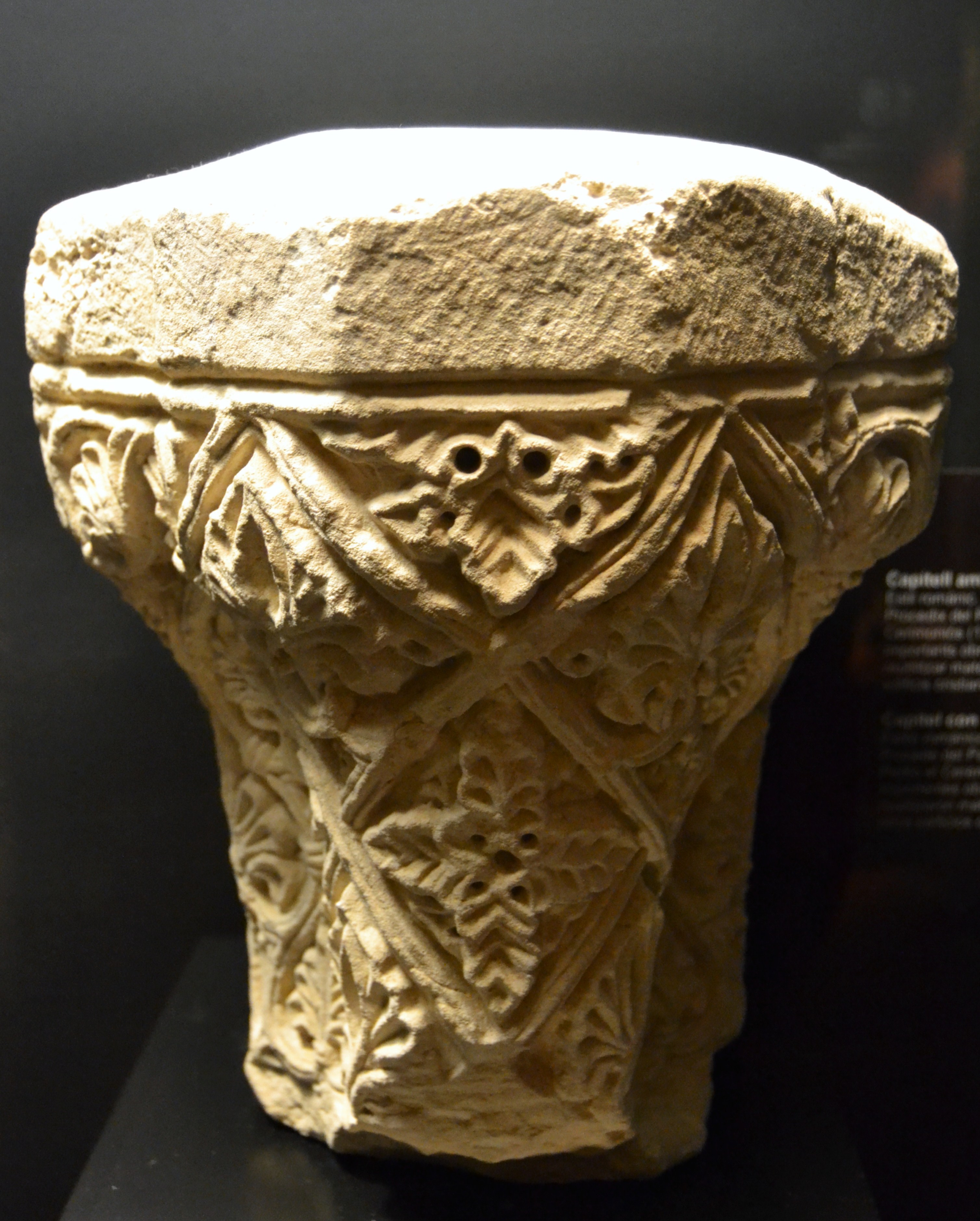
Romanesque capital, now in the Museu d'Història de València.

In 1986, following archival research, the asphalt of General Elio street was lifted, and under it were the remains of the palace. After much controversy over whether the remains were to be buried or laid bare, it was decided to bury them because the street is one of the main arteries of the city.

In 2009, new investigations were conducted with ground-penetrating radar, finding new remains. These were followed with archaeological excavation. Archaeologists unearthed the first walls, belonging to the Torre de la Reina, which was the residence of Queen Maria, wife of Alfonso V of Aragon, and was later used as a kitchen.

The layout of the palace is known from plans drawn in 1802 by military engineer Manuel Cavallero, which were rediscovered in 2004.
