= Gajasimha =

Mythical hybrid animal in Hindu mythology

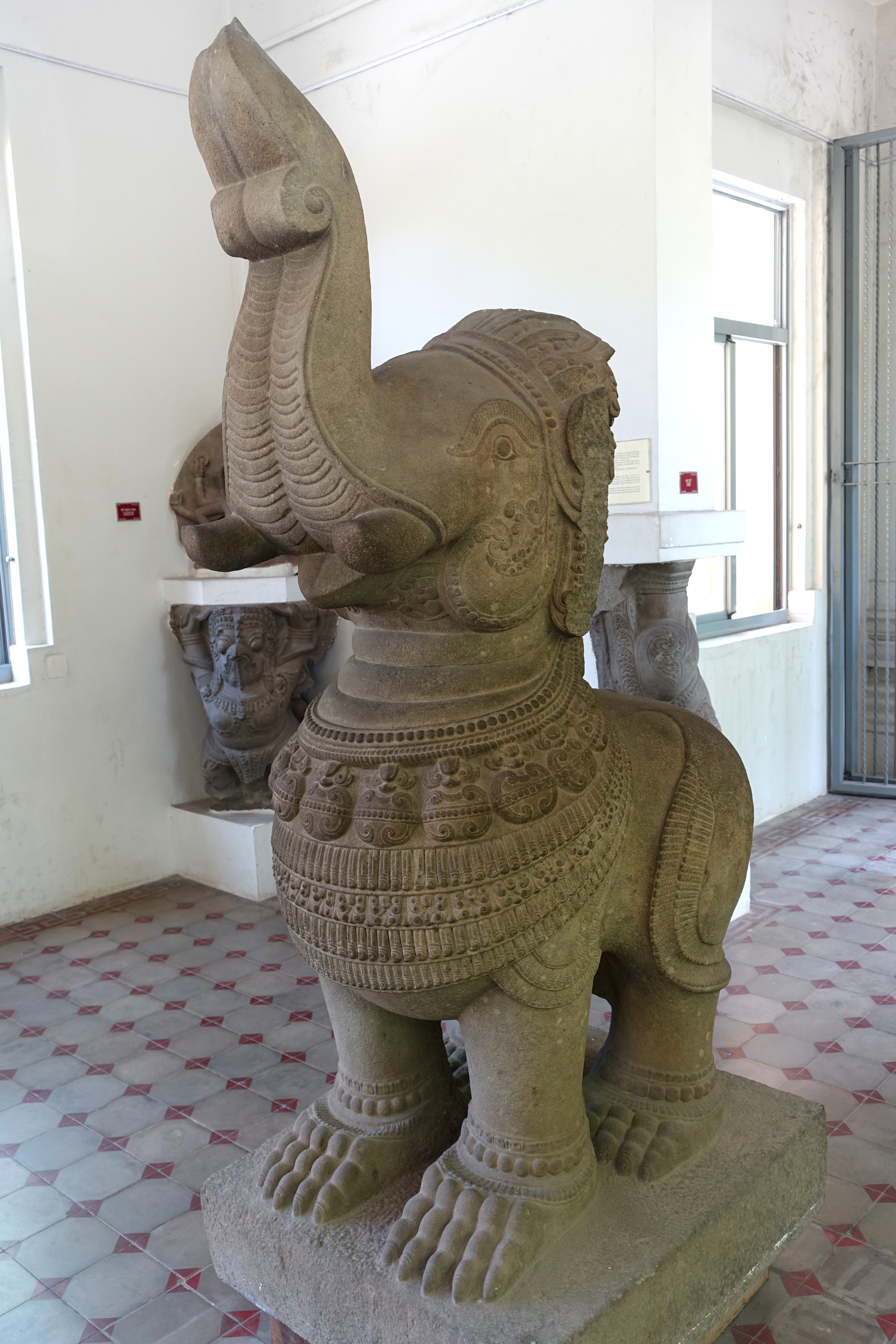
Gajasimha sculpture, Museum of Cham Sculpture, Danang, Vietnam

The gajasimha or gajasiha (from Sanskrit: gaja+siṃha / Pali: gaja+sīha) is a mythical hybrid animal in Hindu mythology, appearing as a sinha or rajasiha (mythical lion) with the head or trunk of an elephant. It is found as a motif in Indian and Sinhalese art, and is used as a heraldic symbol in some Southeast Asian countries, especially Cambodia and Thailand. In Siam (pre-modern Thailand), the gajasimha served as the symbol of the kalahom, one of the king's two chief chancellors. It appears as a supporter in the coat of arms of Siam, in use from 1873 to 1910, and the royal arms of Cambodia, officially adopted in 1993.

== Gallery ==
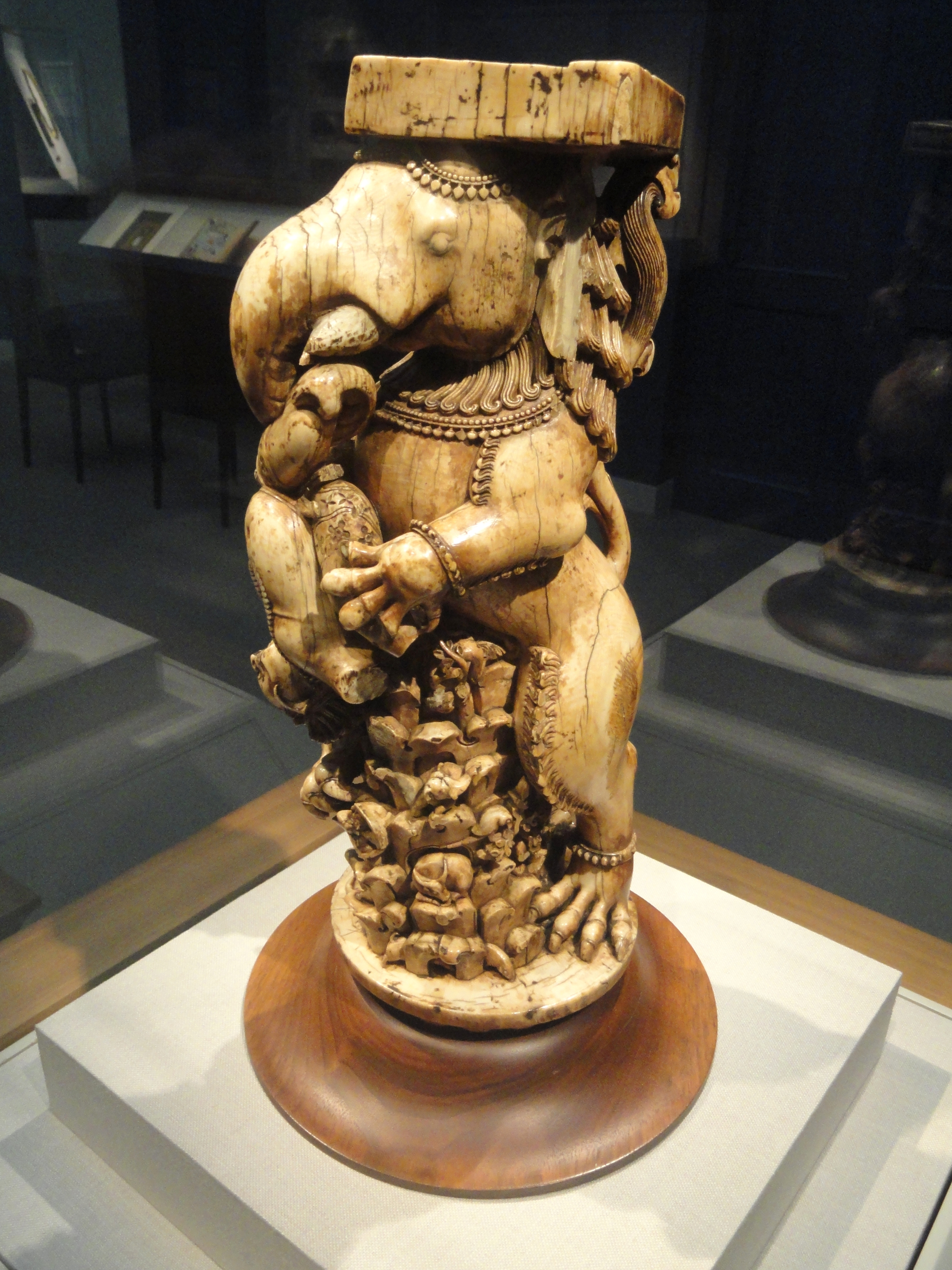
Ivory throne leg, Eastern Ganga dynasty

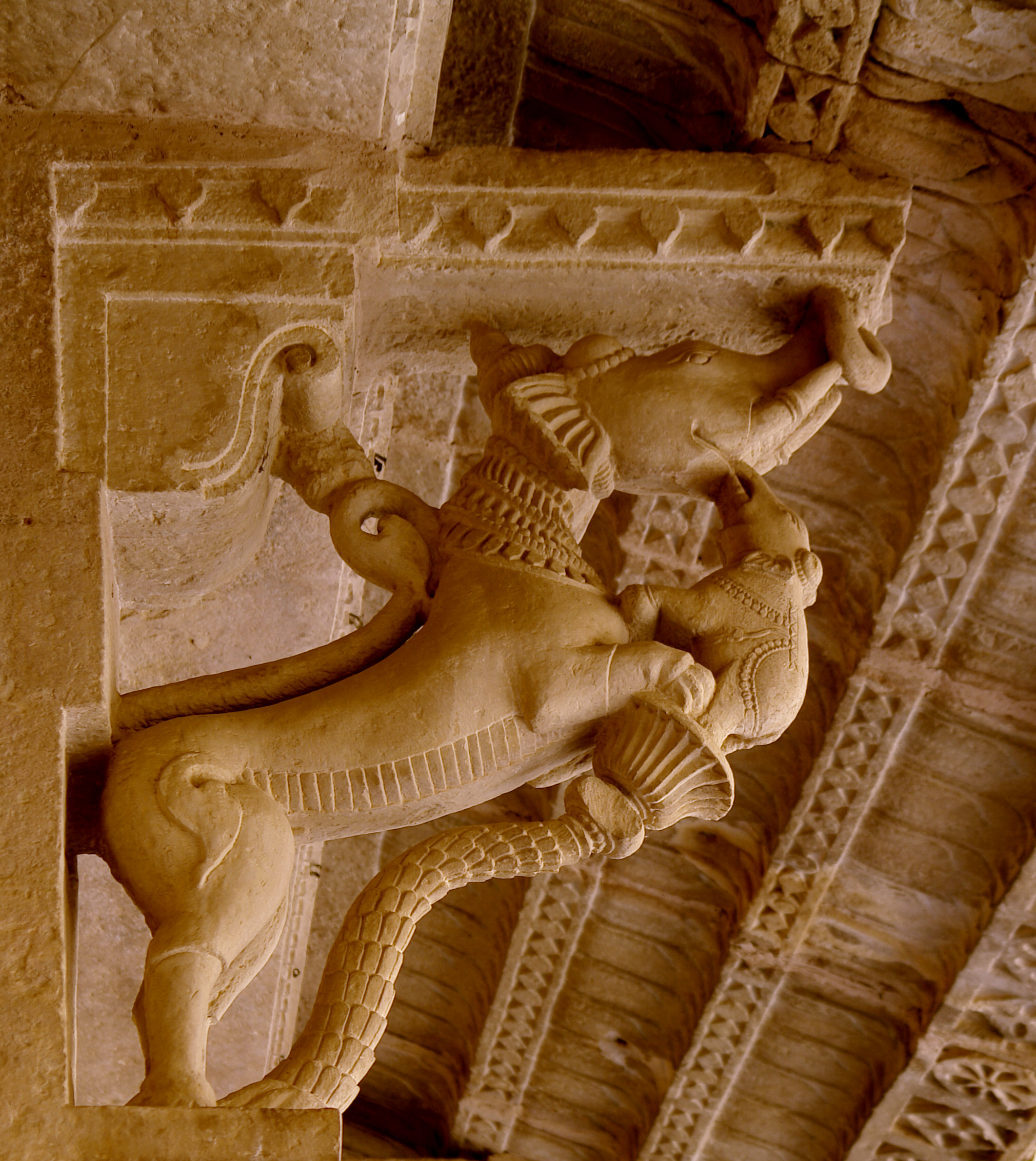
Architectural motif, Gwalior Fort, Madhya Pradesh, India

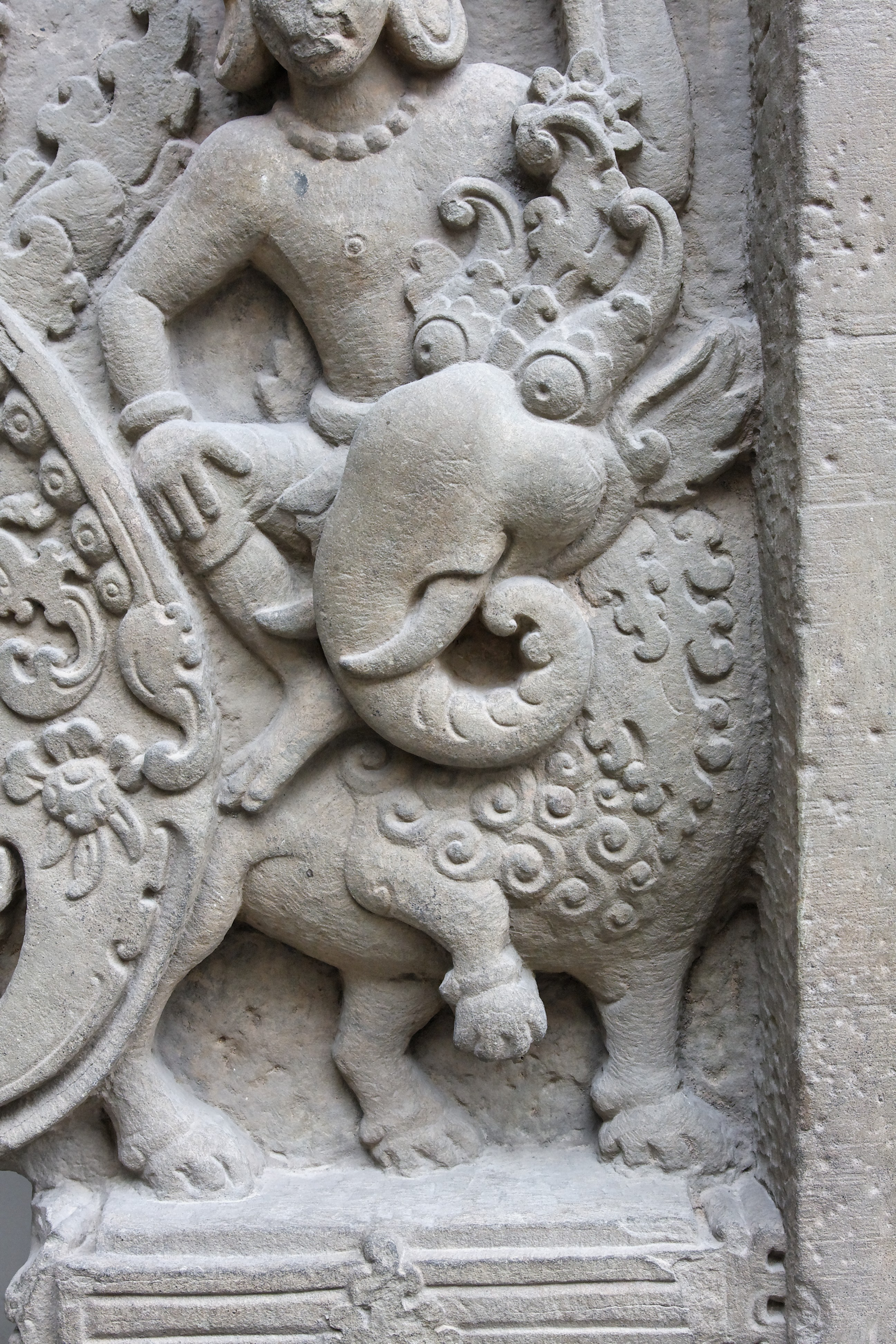
Lintel detail from Prasat Prei Kmeng, Siem Reap, Cambodia

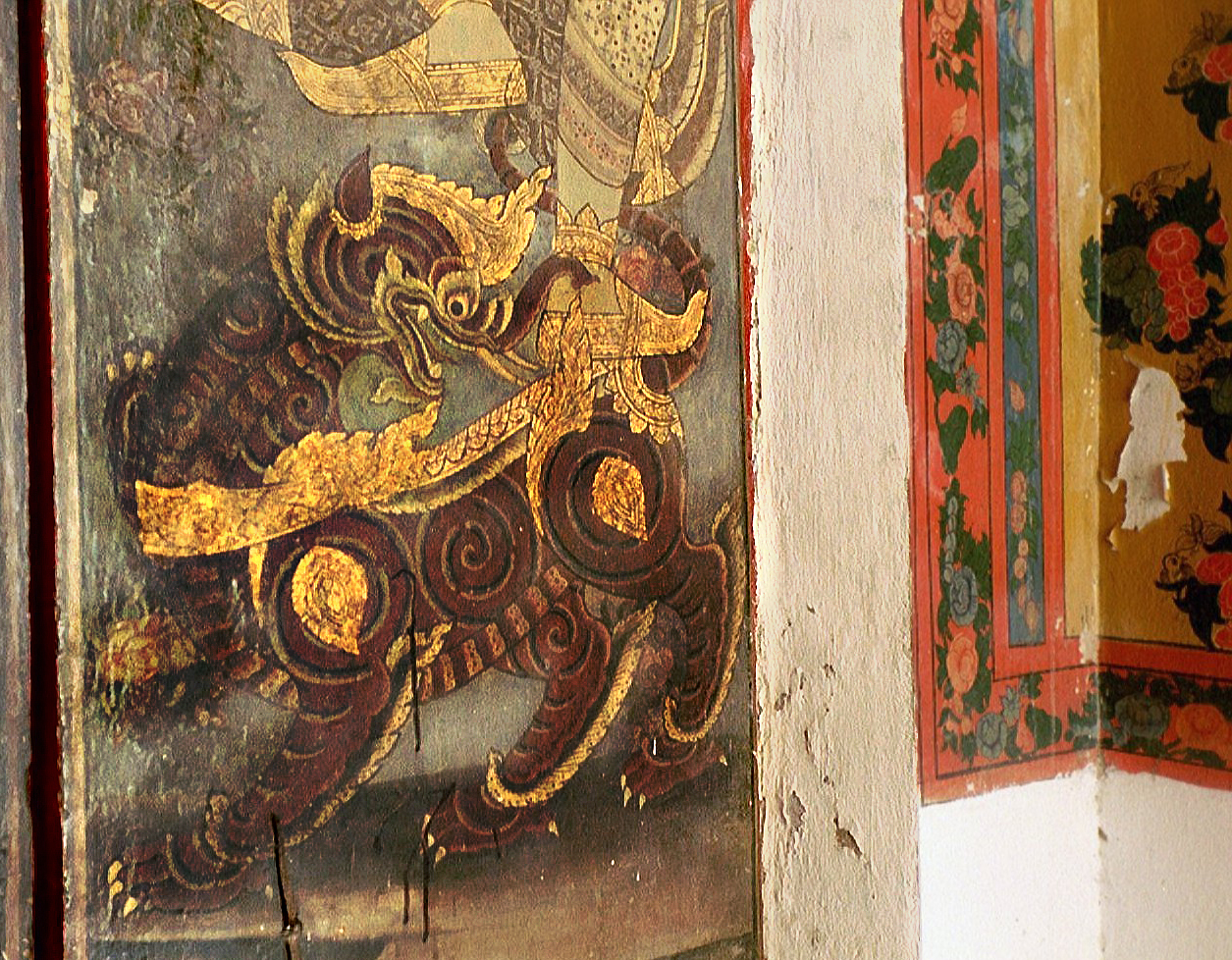
Door painting, Wat Arun, Thailand

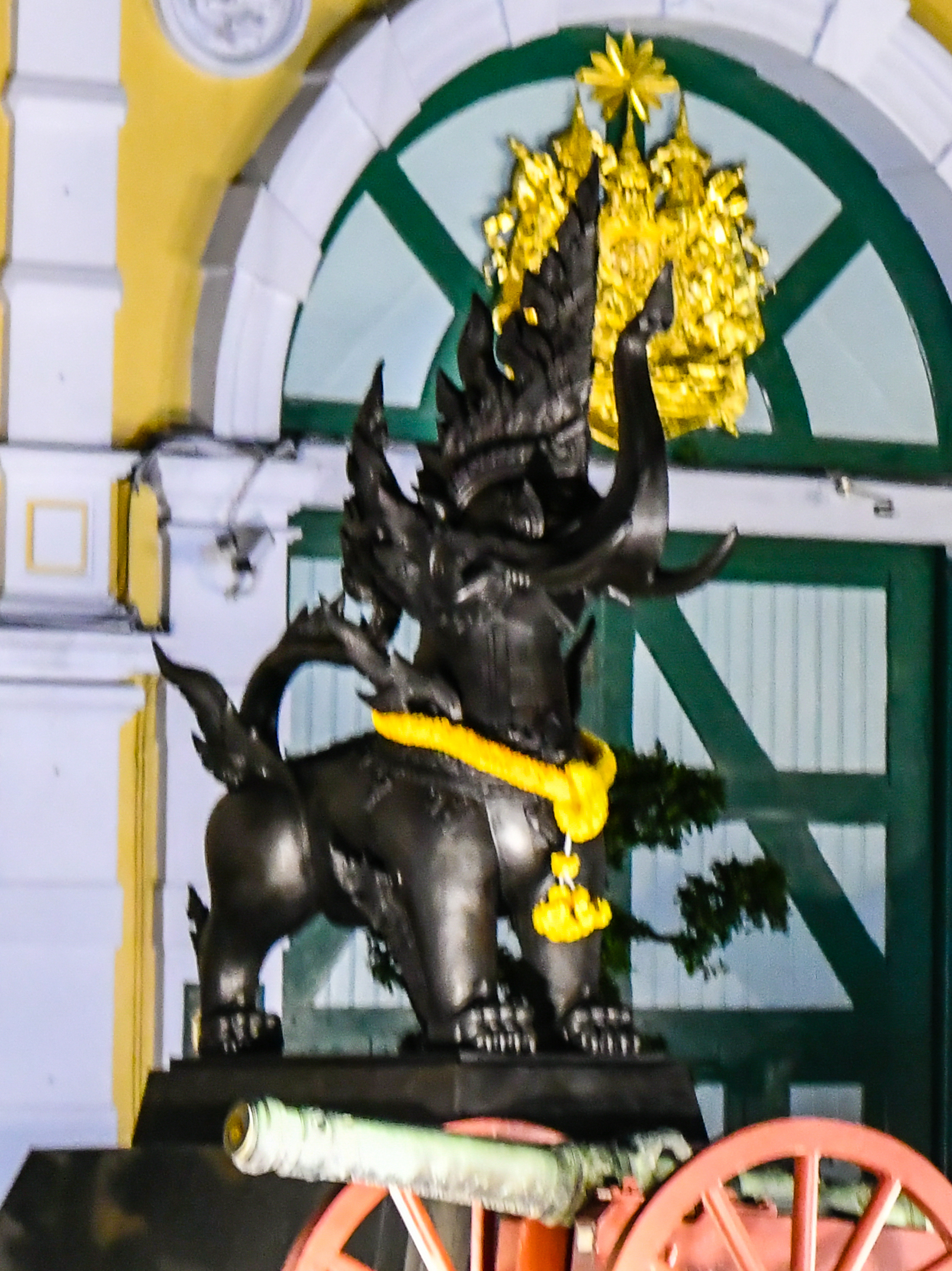
Statue, Ministry of Defence, Thailand

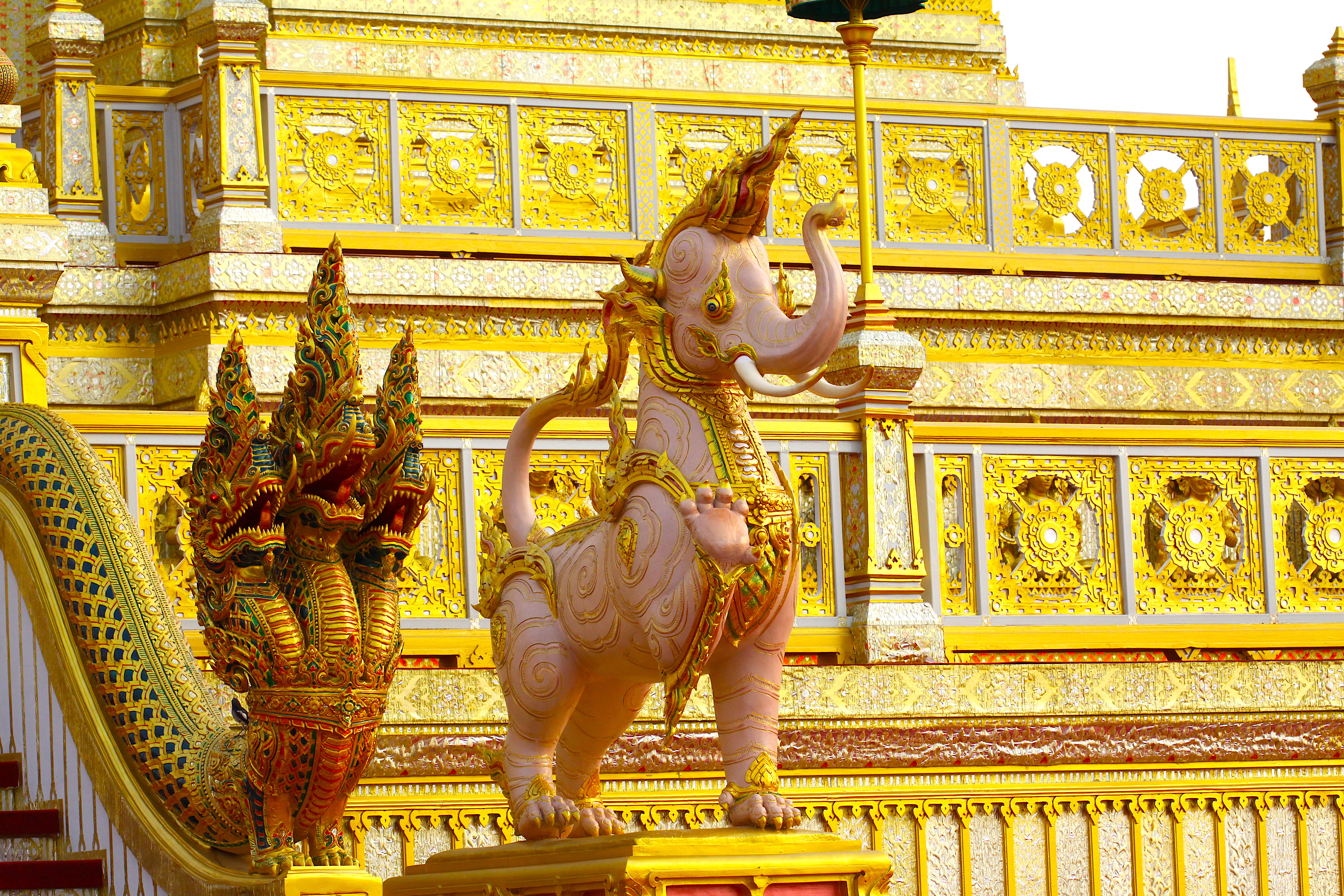
Royal crematorium of King Bhumibol Adulyadej, Thailand

=== In heraldry ===
Royal arms of Cambodia

Coat of arms of Siam

Coat of arms of the Thai 1st Infantry Regiment, King's Close Bodyguard

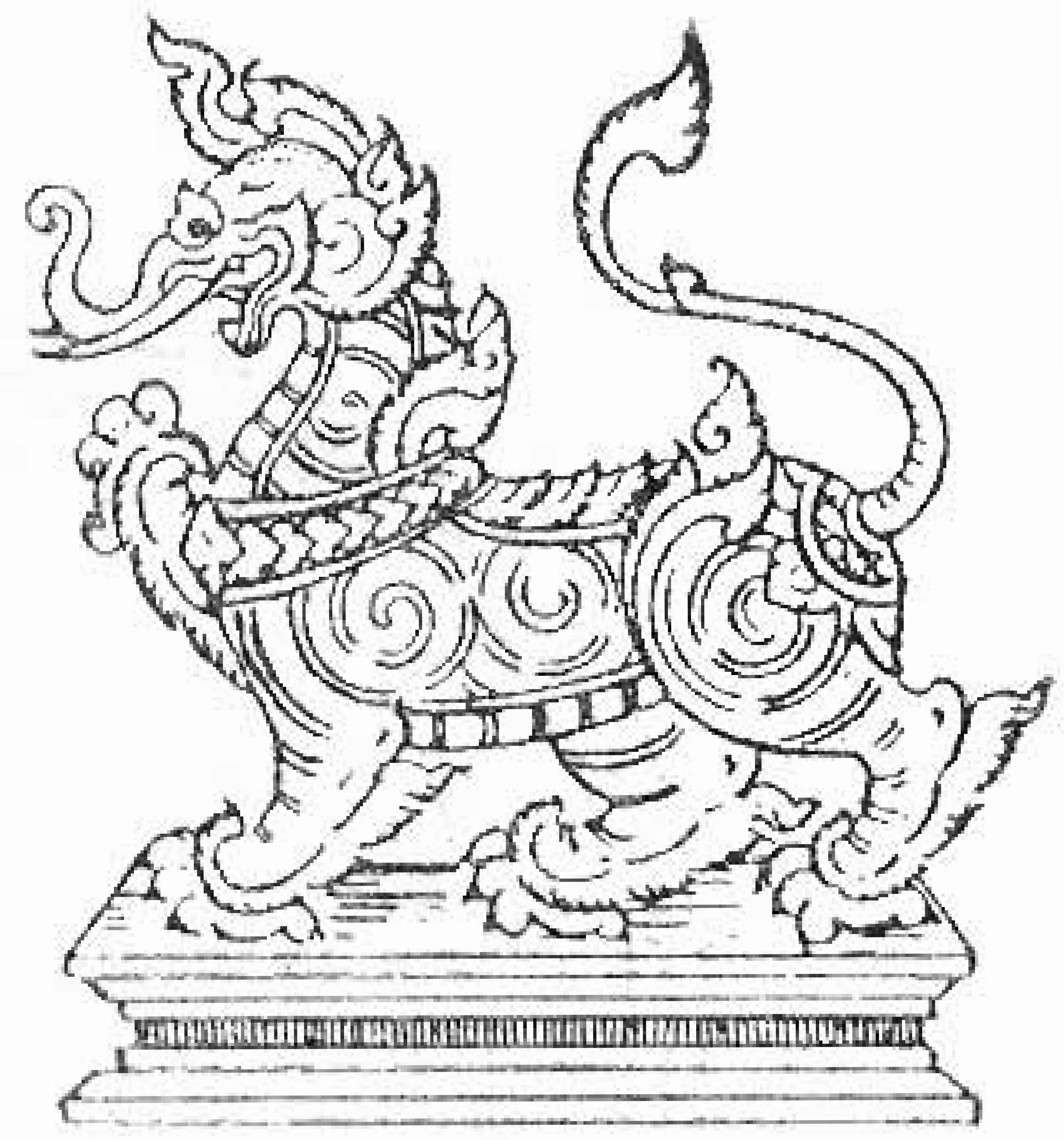
Seal of the Minister of Defence, Siam

Emblem of the Office of the Prime Minister of Thailand

== See also ==
- List of legendary creatures in Hindu mythology
- Yali (mythology)
