= Cambodian tical =

1850–1875 currency of Cambodia, Siam, and Laos

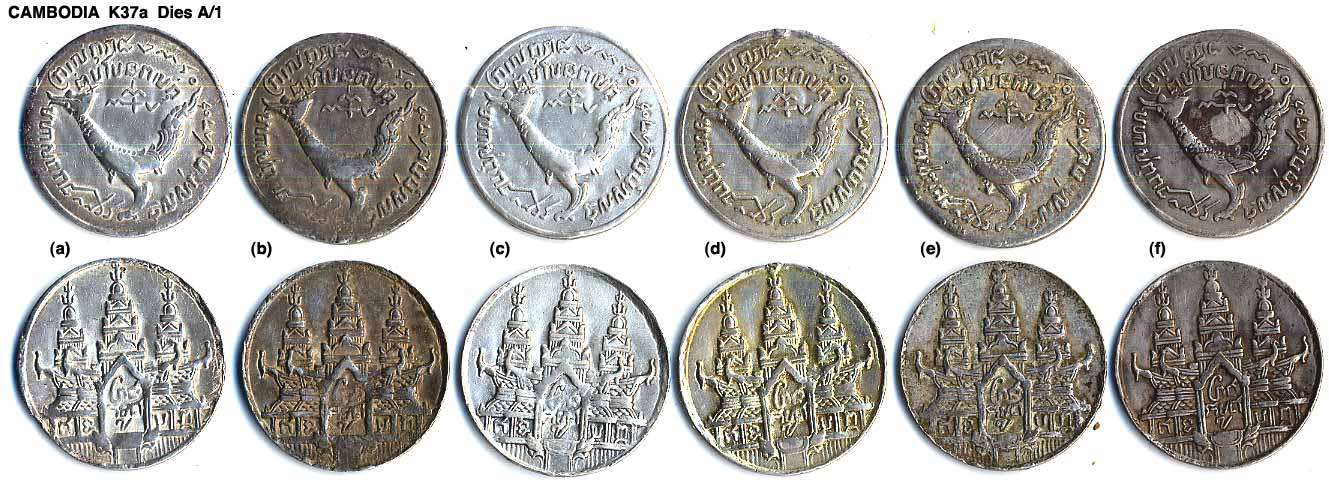
1 tical coins produced in the year 1853.

From the 1850s to 1875, the tical was the currency of Cambodia as well as Siam and Laos. However, as a result of French intervention in the region, the tical in Cambodia was replaced in 1875 by the Cambodian franc. The term tical was the name which foreigners used for the local word baht (which gave rise to the modern Thai baht). The word baht actually referred to a weight in relation to a weight of silver, since the monetary system was based on the weight of silver coins. The tical (or baht) was a silver coin weighing 15 grams, hence giving it a rough similarity in value to the Indian rupee. The tical was subdivided into 64 att, 32 pe, 8 fuang or 4 salong.

== History ==
Ang Duong became King of Cambodia in 1848, and began issuing in the 1850s ticals, which were the first machine-made coins in Cambodia. When Oudong was still the capital of Cambodia, there was an area called Pum Kleang Prak (coin warehouse village) and was the location of a mint that produced ticals.

In Cambodia, the ticals were made from metals like gold and silver, whilst neighbouring countries regularly used copper and zinc in their currency. This made the Cambodian tical the most valuable currency in the region and would help the Cambodian economy. It also allowed Ang Duong to establish ties with the French, which would pave the way for the French protectorate. During French colonial rule, the Cambodian tical was replaced by the Cambodian franc, and subsequently the French Indochinese piastre.

== Coins ==
In 1847 and 1848, coins were issued in denominations of 1 att, 1 and 2 pe, 1 fuang, 1/4, 1 and 4 tical. The 1 att was struck in copper, the 1 and 2 pe were struck in both copper and billon, the 1 fuang was struck in copper, billon and silver, whilst the 1/4, 1 and 4 tical were struck in silver. Many of the smaller coins were uniface.

A Cambodian tical was divisible into 8 fuangs and 64 atts.

== Gallery ==
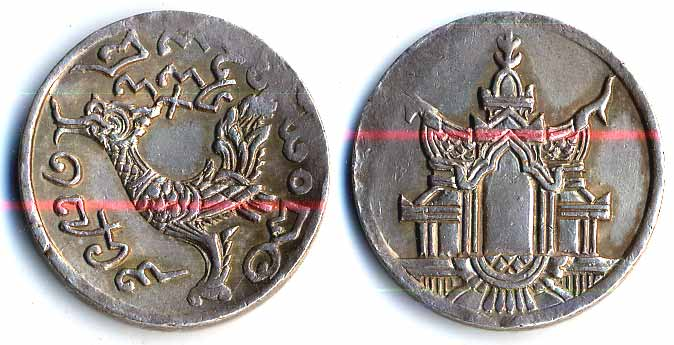
1/4 Tical

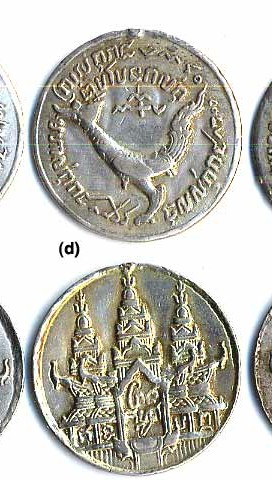
1/4 Tical

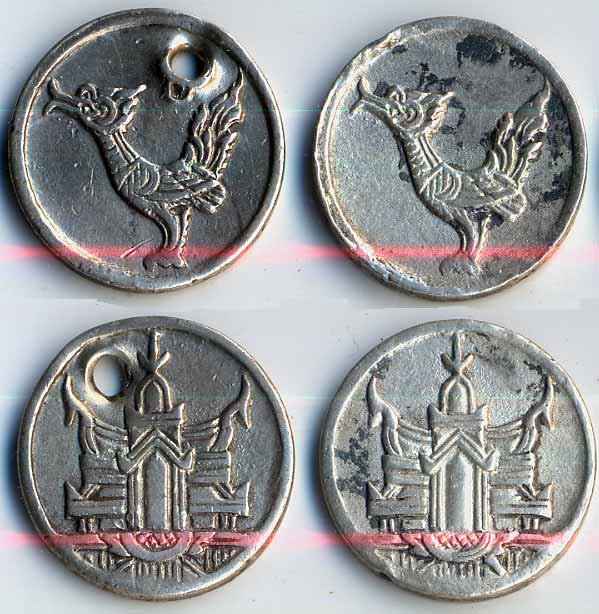
1/8 Tical

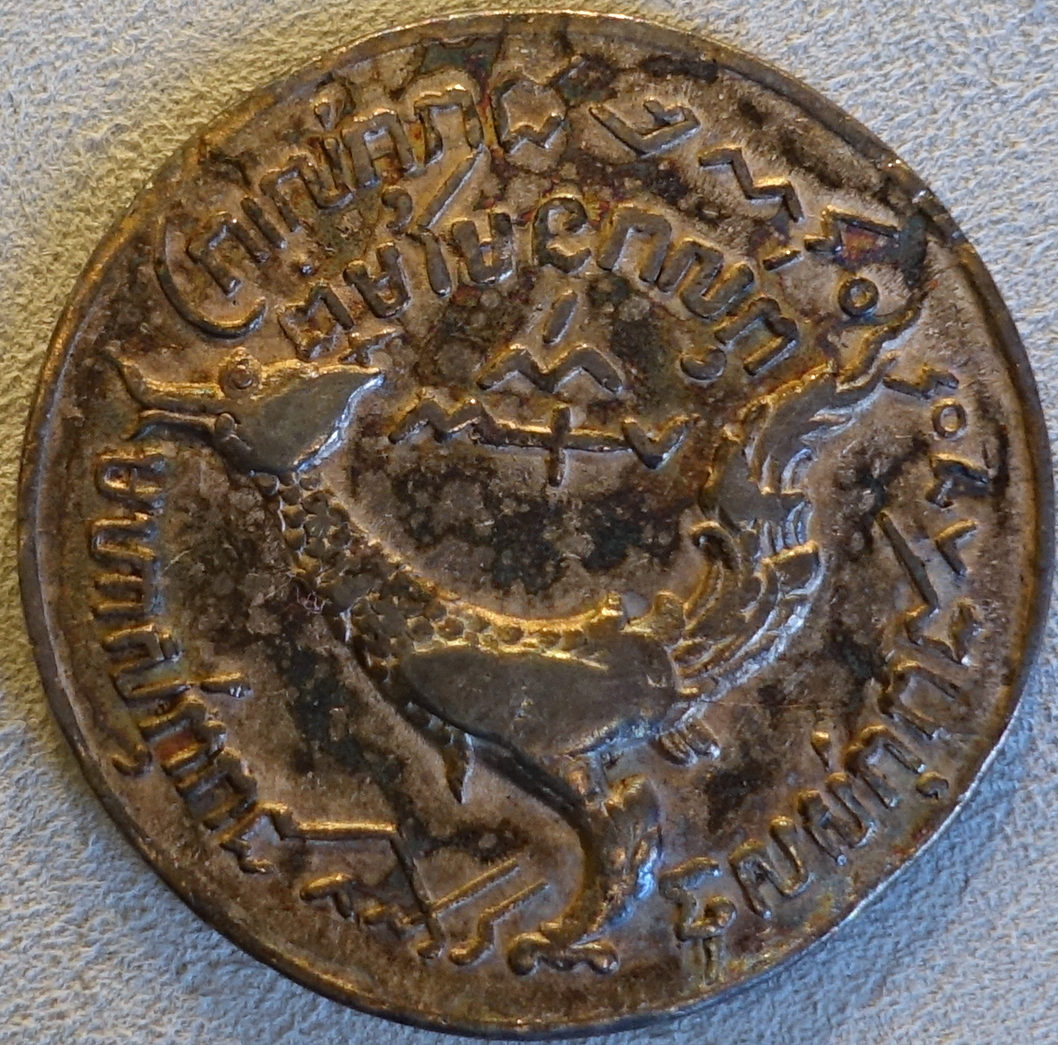
1 Tical from the reign of Norodom I

== See also ==
- Cambodian riel, modern-day currency of Cambodia
