= Coat of arms of Cambodia =

Royal arms of Cambodia

Royal Arms of the Kingdom of Cambodia ព្រះរាជសិង្ហានៃព្រះរាជាណាចក្រកម្ពុជា
- Armiger: Norodom Sihamoni, King of Cambodia
- Adopted: 1953 (original); 1993
- Crest: In place of a crest, the Royal Crown of Cambodia Or emitting rays of light Or
- Shield: Bleu celeste, a sword fesswise Or atop two ceremonial bowls also Or, in chief a representation of the Sacred Aum Or and in base a laurel wreath proper and a representation of the Royal Order of Cambodia also proper
- Supporters: Two creatures: a Gajasingha and a Singha, both Or, holding two five-tiered royal umbrellas, also Or
- Compartment: A ribbon Azure with the motto Argent in Khmer script
- Motto: ព្រះចៅក្រុងកម្ពុជា Preăh Chau Krŏng Kâmpŭchéa ("Ruler of the Kingdom of Cambodia")
- Order: Royal Order of Cambodia

The royal arms of Cambodia is the symbol of the Cambodian monarchy. They have existed in some form since the establishment of the independent Kingdom of Cambodia in 1953. It is the symbol on the royal standard of the reigning monarch of Cambodia, currently King Norodom Sihamoni.

== Description ==
A light blue shield with an Unalome Sign, the Khmer Version of the Aum Symbol, on top of the sword is placed on two ceremonial pedestalled platters (phan) and the laurel wreath superimposed on the Royal Order of Cambodia on the bottom. The shield is placed on the white mantle with golden fringes and the golden decorations on the bottom and is surmounted by the Royal Crown with the shining diamond emanating from the rays of light at the top of the crown. The shield is supported by the two royal animals are the Gajasingha (the lion with an elephant trunk) to the left and the Rajasingha (the royal lion) to the right holding two royal five-tiered umbrellas (one on each side) standing on the blue ribbon with the words: "ព្រះចៅក្រុងកម្ពុជា" (In Khmer, "Ruler of the Kingdom of Cambodia").

The two royal animals of the gajasingha and the rajasingha holding two royal five-tiered umbrellas representing the King and the Queen.

The Cambodian royal standard, with the stylized coat of arms.

The Khmer-language phrase ព្រះចៅក្រុងកម្ពុជា on the banner beneath the royal arms translates to: preăh chau (royal or auspicious ruler) - krŏng (area, or in this case, kingdom) - Kămpŭchéa (Cambodia): "Ruler of the Kingdom of Cambodia".

== History ==
The royal arms were discontinued with the overthrow of the monarchy in the Republican Era (1970–1975). They were restored for official use in 1993 with the reinstatement of the monarchy under HM Norodom Sihanouk.

Other arms were used during succeeding periods: Democratic Kampuchea (i.e., Khmer Rouge era: 1975–1979), the People's Republic of Kampuchea (1979–1989), and the State of Cambodia (1989–1992).

Image	State	In use
	French protectorate of Cambodia (1860–1953) Kingdom of Cambodia (1953–1970) (lesser version)	1860–1970
	Khmer Republic	1970–1975
	Democratic Kampuchea	1976–1982
	Coalition Government of Democratic Kampuchea	1982–1992
	People's Republic of Kampuchea	1979–1981
	People's Republic of Kampuchea	1981–1989
	State of Cambodia	1989–1992
	United Nations Administered Cambodia (UNTAC)	1992–1993
	Kingdom of Cambodia	1953–1970; 1975–1976; 1993–present

== See also ==
- Flag of Cambodia
