= Rial (surname) =

Rial is a surname, family name, or last name (i.e., apellido in Spanish). The surname "Rial" is a very old family name and people with that last name can be found in small numbers in several countries of the western world that use the English language (e.g., Scotland, Canada, The United States) and found in significant numbers in Spanish and Portuguese speaking countries, namely, Spain, several Caribbean countries, and in several North and South American countries. The surname "Rial" is correctly pronounced in modern English like the English words "dial" and "vial" with the accent-stress placed on the first vowel of the diphthong "ia" (i.e., the letter "i"). The surname is correctly pronounced in modern Spanish like the Spanish words "dial" and "vial" where the accent-stress is placed on the final vowel of the diphthong (i.e., the letter "a") which proceeds the final consonant (i.e., the Spanish letter "ele").

Strong speculation indicates that the surname Rial as described here had its origin in the Celtic region of the Iberian Peninsula during the Roman occupation of Spain which occurred from about 140 BCE until about 400 CE. This Celtic region which is now called Galicia is located in the northwestern territory of European Spain and it was formerly named Gallaecia by the Roman occupiers. Galicia is one of the four Autonomous Regions in Spain and Spanish Celtic roots extend beyond Galicia into the western end of The Asturias (one of the four Autonomous Regions) and also into northeastern Portugal.

== Rias of Galicia ==
In the northwestern coastal regions of the Iberian Peninsula which face the Atlantic Ocean on the west and northwest and the Sea of Cantábrica on the north are many deep, navigable channels called "rias". A Ria (ría in Spanish) is an estuary, often with deep water that provides access to the high seas from inland areas on the coasts of The Asturias, Galicia, and Portugal. These ria regions have been used or occupied for many centuries and from these rias, sailors and fishermen can enter the Atlantic coastal waters. The locations of all the rias on the Iberian Peninsula can be seen on a modern map of Spain and Portugal.

== Derivation in Galicia ==
The coastal regions of Galicia have always been used by seafaring people and those regions provide great quantities of seafood for the country and for export. From ancient times, the people who worked or went to sea from these rias were called "the people of the ria" or "the ria people", and eventually those people were designated by the single word "rial" which evolved into the permanent family surname of Rial. Thus, the "Rial's" were people who always worked in or were associated with rias. In Galicia, there were and still are several versions of the use of the word ria as applied to the "ria people". One is "los de la ría" (Spanish for the people of the ria) or "os da ria" (Galician for the people of the ria). Another common use of the surname Rial is "O Rial" (meaning "The Rial" in Galician) which is used to designate the place of the Rial parish or Rial clan. From the foregoing, it is strongly believed that the surname Rial has a Celtic origin that came into existence in the Celtic Region of Galicia.

== General distribution ==
Near the Atlantic coastal area of Galicia between Galicia's capitol of Santiago de Compostela in the north to its southern border with Portugal can be found at least three villages named "Rial" on current maps (ref. 3, op cit) and at least one village named O Rial. Also, the surname Rial can be found of the official list of recognized Galician surnames at Xenealoxia. The distribution of the Rial surname (apellido) in Galicia and in other parts of Spain can also be further found in Xenealoxia (op cit) under "Rial" which indicated approximately 1360 "Rial's" listed in Galicia out of approximately 3850 "Rial's" listed for all of Spain.

Today, the greatest concentration of people with the surname Rial in Spain is found in Galicia in or near the city of Pontevedra which is very near the Ria de Vigo. In 2007, approximately 700 people with the surname Rial could be found in the telephone listings in the white pages of Pontevedra, Galicia. Today, large numbers of former Galicians and their families can be found near the Rio de la Plata region of Argentina and Uruguay with smaller numbers in Puerto Rico, Cuba, Mexico, and Brazil, and very few in the countries of Great Britain, The United States, and Canada. There are so many Galician-related people living in the Rio Plata region that ethnic European people are often referred to as Gallegos (meaning Galicians in Spanish), whether their roots are Galician or not.

== People with the name ==
- Ali Rial (born 1980), Algerian footballer
- Carlos Pérez Rial (born 1979), Spanish sprint canoer
- Delmar Rial Lowell (1844–1912), American Civil War veteran, historian and genealogist
- Héctor Rial (1928–1991), Argentine-Spanish footballer
- Horacio Vázquez-Rial (1947–2012), Argentine writer and translator
- Jorge Rial (born 1961), Argentine journalist and TV host
- Juan Pablo Rial (born 1984), Argentine footballer
- Louise Rial (c.1849–1940), American actress
- Martha Rial (born 1961), American photographer
- Monica Rial (born 1975), American voice actress
- Noemí Rial (1947–2019), Argentine lawyer and politician
- Nuria Rial (born 1975), Spanish soprano
- Sarah Cleto Rial (born 1967), South Sudanese politician and activist
- Vanessa Rial (born 1982), Spanish rugby player
- Xairo Rial (born 2005), Spanish footballer
