= Louis Riel (disambiguation) =

Louis Riel (1844–1885) was a Métis resistance leader in Canada.

Louis Riel may also refer to:

== Arts, entertainment, media ==
- Louis Riel (comics), a 2003 comics biography by Chester Brown
- Louis Riel (opera), a 1967 opera by Harry Somers
- Louis Riel (sculpture), a sculpture by Miguel Joyal on the grounds of the Manitoba Legislative Building at Winnipeg, Manitoba, Canada

== Places ==
- Louis Riel Trail or Saskatchewan Highway 11, Saskatchewan, Canada
- Louis Riel School Division, Winnipeg, Manitoba, Canada

=== Schools ===
- École secondaire publique Louis-Riel (French: Louis-Riel Public Secondary School) Blackburn Hamlet, Ottawa, Ontario, Canada; a French-language public highschool
- Louis Riel School, Calgary, Alberta, Canada; a K-9 school
- Louis Riel Arts and Technology Centre, Winnipeg, Manitoba, Canada; a vocational highschool

== Other uses ==
- Louis Riel Sr. (1817–1864), father of the Métis rebel leader
- Louis Riel Day, a statutory holiday in Manitoba, Canada

== See also ==
- Anjou–Louis-Riel, Montreal, Quebec, Canada; a provincial electoral district
