= Cambodian franc =

Former currency of Cambodia

Franc (French)
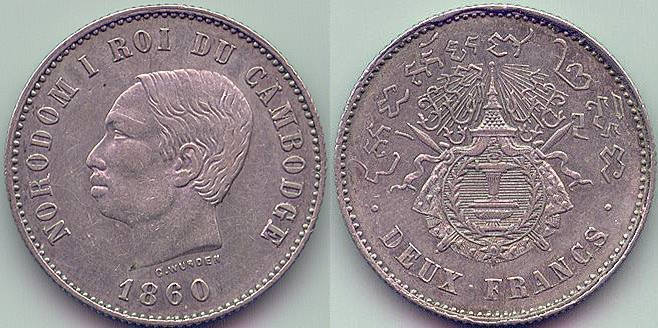
- 2 Francs 1860

Denominations
- Superunit
- 5.37: piastre
- Subunit
- 1/100: centime
- Coins
- Rarely used: 1, 5, 10, 25, 50 centimes, 1, 2, 4 francs, 1 piastre

Demographics
- User(s): French Cambodia
- This infobox shows the latest status before this currency was rendered obsolete.

The franc was the currency of Cambodia between 1875 and 1885. It was equal to the French franc and was similarly subdivided into 100 centimes. It circulated alongside the piastre (equal to the Mexican peso) with 1 piastre = 5.37 francs. It replaced the tical and was replaced by the piastre. No paper money was issued.

== Coins ==
Coins were issued in denominations of 5, 10, 25 and 50 centimes, 1, 2 and 4 francs and 1 piastre. The 5 and 10 centimes were struck in bronze, with the remaining pieces in silver. All the coins were dated 1860 but were minted (mostly in Belgium) in 1875. They all bear the portrait of King Norodom. In about 1900, some of the silver coins were restruck but at approximately 15% reduced weights.

== See also ==
- French Indochinese piastre

Preceded by: Cambodian tical	Currency of Cambodia; 1875 – 1885	Succeeded by: French Indochinese piastre Reason: creation of a common currency for French Indochina; Ratio: 1 piastre = 5.37 francs
