= Real (residence) =

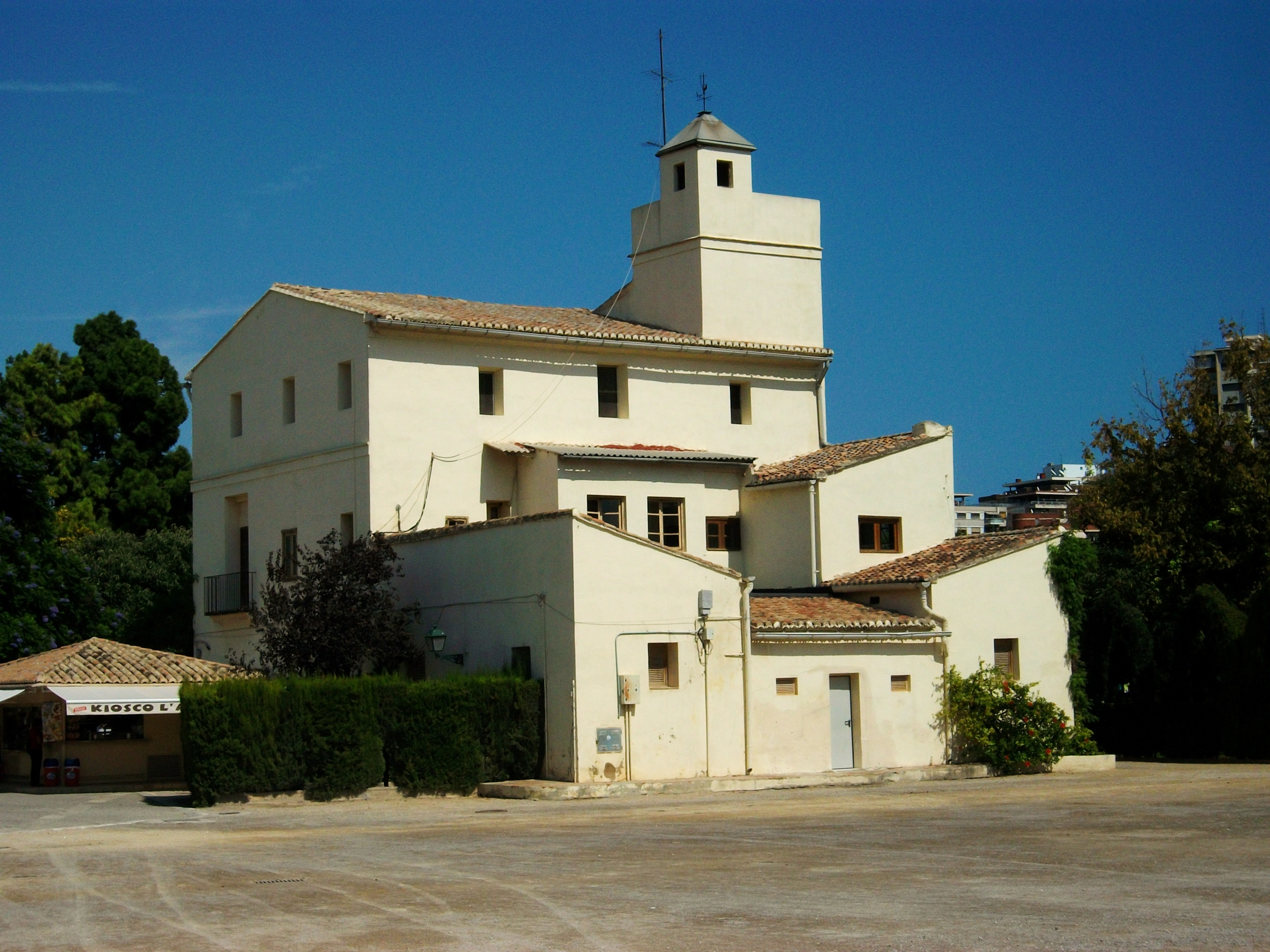
"Alqueria de Canet" buildings within the Real Gardens in Valencia.

During the time of Sharq al-Andalus a real (from the Arabic Riyad) was a kind of orchard or garden, with some kind of building as summer residence that used to belong to a member of Andalusian urban oligarchy, located around the cities or large farmhouses.

In this sense, in other areas of Al-Andalus it is also used the word Almunia. An example would be Real Palace of Valencia, although the term Real continues within the Catalan to Arabism, present in many place names like Secar de la Real in Palma de Mallorca, the Montroy and Real de Gandia, or the same Pla del Real in Valencia. It is very common to confuse etymology with a derivative of royal or relating to the king, which is more explicit in the case of the Real Palace as it was royal residence.
