= Riehl (surname) =

Riehl is a German surname. Notable people with the surname include:

- Alois Riehl (1844–1924), Austrian philosopher
- Emily Riehl, American mathematician
- Herbert Riehl (1915-1997), German-born American meteorologist
- Kevin Riehl (born 1971), Canadian professional ice hockey player
- Nikolaus Riehl (1901–1990), German nuclear chemist
- Walter Riehl (1881–1955), Austrian lawyer and politician
- Wilhelm Heinrich Riehl (1823–1897), German journalist, novelist and folklorist
