= Van Riel =

Van Riel is a Dutch toponymic surname indicating an origin in the town of Riel, Goirle in North Brabant. Less likely is an origin in a former hamlet of the same name that is now a neighborhood in Eindhoven. People with the surname include:

- Cees van Riel (born 1951), Dutch organizational theorist
- Eef van Riel (born 1991), Dutch football midfielder
- Harm van Riel (1907–1980), Dutch VVD politician and businessman
- Henri Van Riel (1908–???), Belgian sailor
- Marten Van Riel (born 1992), Belgian triathlete
- Raimondo Van Riel (1881–1962), Italian actor
- Sied van Riel (born 1978), Dutch trance music DJ and producer
- Stefan Van Riel (born 1970), Belgian footballer
