= Réal (given name) =

French male given name

- Gender: Masculine
- Language: French

Origin
- Meaning: "Royal"
- Region of origin: Quebec

Réal is a French language masculine given name derived from the borrowing of the Catalan language réal or the Spanish language real, meaning "royal". Réal, as a given name, is found predominantly in Quebec and other Canadian French speaking areas.

Individuals bearing the name Réal include:

- Réal Andrews (born 1963), Canadian actor
- Réal Bossé (born 1962), Canadian actor
- Réal Bouvier (1946–2000), Canadian navigator and journalist
- Réal Caouette (1917–1976), Canadian politician
- Réal Chevrefils (1932–1981), Canadian ice hockey player
- Réal Cloutier (born 1956), Canadian ice hockey player
- Réal Favreau, Canadian judge
- Réal Godbout, Canadian writer and comic book illustrator
- Réal Gauvin (born 1935), Canadian politician
- Réal Giguère (1933–2019), Canadian television host and broadcaster
- Réal Lapierre (born 1944), Canadian politician
- Réal Lemieux (1945–1975), Canadian ice hockey player
- Réal Ménard (born 1962), Canadian politician
- Réal Ouellet (1935–2022), Canadian writer and academic
- Réal Paiement (born 1959), Canadian hockey player and coach
