= Rhéal =

Rhéal is a masculine given name. Notable people with the name include:

- Rhéal Bélisle (1919–1992), Canadian politician
- Rhéal Cormier (1967–2021), Canadian baseball player
- Rhéal Fortin, Canadian lawyer and politician
