= Mach (disambiguation) =

Mach or Mach number is speed expressed as a multiple of the speed of sound.

Mach may also refer to:

== Computing ==
- Mach (kernel), an operating systems kernel technology
- ATI Mach, a 2D GPU chip by ATI
- GNU Mach, the microkernel upon which GNU Hurd is based

== Places ==
- Mach, Balochistan, a town in Pakistan
  - Mach railway station, a railway station in Machh, Pakistan
- Machynlleth or Mach, a town in Wales
- Mach (crater), a lunar crater
- 3949 Mach, an asteroid

== People ==
- Mach (surname)
- Hayato Sakurai (born 1975), Japanese mixed martial artist known as "Mach"
- Mach, a fictional character in Mach a Šebestová

== Arts and entertainment ==
- "Mach" (song), a 2010 song by Rainbow
- Mach (Transformers), a Multiforce character in Transformers: Victory
- M.A.C.H. (video game)
- M.A.C.H., a fictional series of cyborg and robot agents in M.A.C.H. 1
- Mach: The First Colony, a 1983 role-playing game

== Other uses ==
- Muscarinic acetylcholine receptor (mACh), of cells
- Fly Castelluccio Mach, an Italian paramotor design
- Vietnamese mạch, an obsolete Vietnamese currency unit
- MACH-IV (test), the test used to assess the Machiavellianism construct

== See also ==
- Mac (disambiguation)
- Mach O (disambiguation)
- Mach 1 (disambiguation)
- Mach 2 (disambiguation)
- Mach 3 (disambiguation)
- Mach 4 (disambiguation)
- Mach 5 (disambiguation)
- Mach 6 (disambiguation)
- Mach 7 (disambiguation)
- Mach 8 (disambiguation)
- Mach 9 (disambiguation)
- Mach 10 (disambiguation)
- Mache (unit), an obsolete unit of volumic radioactivity
- Mack (disambiguation)
- Mak (disambiguation)
