= Macha (disambiguation) =

Macha is the name of a goddess and several other characters in Irish mythology.

Macha may also refer to:

== Places ==
- Macha crater, a group of meteorite craters in the Sakha Republic, Russia
- Macha, Russia, several rural localities in Russia
- Macha, Zambia, a region and chiefdom in the Southern Province of Zambia
- Lake Mácha, artificial fish pond in the Czech Republic

== People ==
- Macha (surname), a Polish surname
- Mácha, a Czech surname
- Macha Oromo, a division or sub-group of the Oromo people

=== Given name ===
- Macha Grenon (born 1968), Canadian actress
- Macha Méril (born 1940), French actress and writer
- Macha Rosenthal (1917–1996), American poet and editor
- Macha van der Vaart (born 1972), Dutch hockey player
- M. Macha Nightmare, American Neopagan witch

=== Fictional characters ===
- Macha, a playable character in Chrono Cross
- Macha, alternative name of Mia, a character in the anime .hack//SIGN

== Other uses ==
- LÉ Macha (01), a ship in the Irish Naval Service, named for the goddess
- Macha (band), defunct American experimental post-rock band from Georgia
- Macha Mission, a Christian mission in Zambia
- Mid-American Collegiate Hockey Association (MACHA), an American Collegiate Hockey Association Division 2 conference not sanctioned by the NCAA
- Mesodesma donacium, a Chilean native clam colloquially known as a macha, used for example in the dish Machas a la parmesana
- Ensis macha, an edible razor clam from South America, mainly fished in Chile, and known colloquially as navaja or navajuela
- "Macha Macha Re", a song in the 2022 Bollywood movie Dasvi

== See also ==
- Matcha, powdered green tea used, for example, in the Japanese tea ceremony
- Flag of Macha, the remains of the first physical flag of Argentina
- Santiago de Macha, a town in Potosí Department, Bolivia
