= Machajewski =

Machajewski is a family name or a surname with roots in Northern Poland.

Today family members can be found in Poland, United States, Russia, France, England, and Brazil.

Possible roots are:

- 1. Czech last name Mach comes from Biblical name Martin.
- 2. Machajewski could have been created on the basis of a Polish word: machaj, which means "to wave at someone".

The basis of last name Machajewski is possibly Mach. This Czech, Polish and German surname (of Slavonic origin) originally derived from the given name Mach, is a pet form of the Czech Matěj, a form of Matthew. This given name was of biblical origin, ultimately from the Hebrew male font name Matityahu, recorded in the Greek New Testament in the form Matthias. The name has numerous variant spellings which include Macha/Mácha, Machač, Machal, Macháň/Machaň, Machon, Machala, Machnicki, Machocki, Macháček and Machotka. The modern state of Czechoslovakia is going through a transitional phase as a result of the fall of the Iron Curtain. Its various regions encompassed the medieval provinces of Bohemia, Moravia, and Slovakia. The first two of these, where the language properly called Czech is spoken, were heavily subject to German cultural and linguistic influence from the Middle Ages onwards, being administratively a Crownland of Austria for much of the time until independence in 1918. This influence is reflected in the many Czech surnames derived from German, both from given names, and from vocabulary words. Occupational names are quite common in Czech as are nicknames, especially those referring to some physical feature. Many of the most common Czech surnames have the diminutive ending -ček, which is often found attached to these names. Ernst Mach (1863–1916), the Austrian physicist who gave his name to the system of speed measurement which uses MACH numbers, was born in Moravia. It was not until the 10th century that modern hereditary surnames first developed, and the use of fixed names spread, first to France, and then England, then to Germany and all of Europe. In these parts of Europe, the individual man was becoming more important, commerce was increasing and the exact identification of each man was becoming a necessity. Even today however, the Church does not recognise surnames. Baptisms and marriages are performed through use of the Christian name alone. Thus hereditary names as we know them today developed gradually during the 11th to the 15th century in the various European countries.

Alternative origin:

The surname Machajewski is of Polish origin. It is derived from the given name Maciej, which is the Polish form of the name Matthias, meaning "gift of Yahweh" in Hebrew. The suffix "-ewski" is a common ending for Polish surnames and means "of" or "belonging to". Therefore, Machajewski can be roughly translated to "of Maciej" or "belonging to Maciej". The name is most commonly found in Poland and is likely to have originated from a person who was either named Maciej or belonged to a family with that name.
