= Khải Định Thông Bảo =

Currency

Khải Định Thông Bảo (啓定通寳)
- Nguyễn dynasty (French Indochina)
- Value: 6 văn (1/200 French Indochinese piastre)
- Mass: first series = 2.28 g second series = 2.10 g
- Diameter: 22 mm
- Thickness: 1 mm
- Composition: Brass
- Years of minting: 1921–1933
- Mintage: 27,629,000 (first series); 200,000,000 (second series)

Obverse
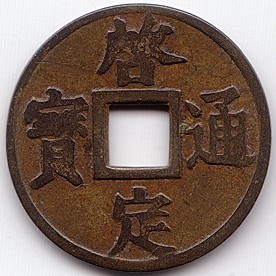
- Design: 啓定通寳 (Khải Định Thông Bảo)

Reverse
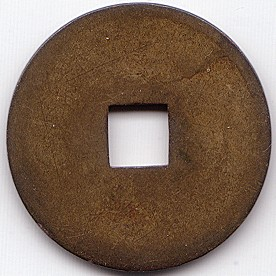
- Design: Blank

The Khải Định Thông Bảo (chữ Hán: 啓定通寳; (Note: Commonly written as "啓定通寶" in modern sources.) French: Sapèque Khaï-Dinh) was a French Indochinese sapèque coin produced from 1921 until 1933, the design of the coin was round with a square hole that was used for stringing them together. Khải Định became Emperor of Annam in 1916 the funding for the production of new cash coins was reduced by the Hanoi Mint which lead to the demand of the Vietnamese market for low value denominations to not be met, furthermore, after Hanoi reduced funding for the Thanh Hóa Mint, which until that time was producing enough low denomination cast cash coins to meet the market's demands, which caused most, but not all, of the production of cash coins at the mint to cease in 1920. In response a new committee was formed in Hanoi which ordered the creation of machine-struck Khải Định Thông Bảo cash coins, these are the first machine-struck four character Thông Bảo (通寳) coins in Vietnam with the reigning emperor's name as the French government had prior tried to introduce a Cochinchinese 2 sapèque coin that continued under French Indochina that weighed 2.05 grams and had a nominal value of 1/500 piastre, later the colonial government of the French Protectorate of Tonkin had unsuccessfully tried to introduce a zinc milled sapèque produced by the Paris Mint with a nominal value of 1/600 piastre from 1905 until 1906. Unlike the earlier attempts at producing machine-struck cash coins by the colonial French authorities the Khải Định Thông Bảo proved to be much more successful as the first series had a production of 27,629,000 coins while the second series greatly exceeded this with around 200,000,000 coins produced in Huế, Haiphong, and Hanoi. The Khải Định Thông Bảo continued to be produced long after the death of Emperor Khải Định under his successor Bảo Đại until it was phased out by the Bảo Đại Thông Bảo (保大通寳) in 1933.

In the French protectorate of Annam cash coins were still being used for virtually all transactions as late as 1921, in order to combat deflation the Khải Định Thông Bảo was introduced and mass-produced. The new machine-struck were produced in the French protectorate of Tonkin to be placed into the treasury of the government of the Nguyễn dynasty until an opportune moment would present itself to introduce them into general circulation to combat the negative effects of hoarding, which resulted in the gradual disappearance of older cash coins from circulation causing the low denomination copper-alloy coins to become scarce. The new Khải Định Thông Bảo cash coins were introduced with a hope to reduce the cost of living caused by delfation.

The French government in Annam announced in their official bulletin that they would exchange 1 Khải Định Thông Bảo cash coin for 6 zinc cash coins in order to promote their circulation. According to an ordonnance entitled Fixing the exchange of the new cash coins bearing the reign era of Khải Định (Fixant la valeur d'échange de la nouvelle sapèque portant la chiffre de Règne Khai-Dinh) signed on 01-09-Khải Định 5 (12 October 1920) by five of the six ministers of the Nguyễn dynasty, the Khải Định Emperor, and the Governor-General of French Indochina Maurice Long, the people of Đại Nam are "warned that cash coins are for their daily life and serve as an article of their very first necessity" and that "there is no worse malaise than the scarcity of cash coins", while emphasising that the production costs of the currency is higher than their nominal and market value and that their continued production constitutes a heavy burden both for the French Indochinese and Nguyễn dynasty governments, but that the government prefers to bear this burden than let the people suffer from the negative consequences of their scarcity.

Because the machine-struck Khải Định Thông Bảo cash coins were heavier than the earlier milled 2 sapèques produced by the Paris Mint, they were likely valued at 1/200 piastre. A number of the machine-struck cash coins were produced by Poinsard & Veyret Comptoirs D'Extrême-Orient in Hải Phòng, French Tonkin. While the Hanoi-made coins were struck by the Banque de l'Indochine.

In Tonkin these coins were welcomed and circulated with small denomination coins of the French Indochinese piastre, while in Annam the people were more reluctant to adopt the new machine-struck coinage.

== Other coins ==
The inscription "Khải Định Thông Bảo" was also used for non-cash coins produced under the reign of Emperor Khải Định for tiền (錢) and lạng (兩) coins made from silver and gold, respectively. Although more commonly the inscription Khải Định Niên Tạo (啓定年造) was used for silver ingots (sycees).

== See also ==
- Cash (Chinese coin)
- Tự Đức Thông Bảo
- Tự Đức Bảo Sao

== Sources ==
- Daniel, Howard A. III (2018). The Catalog and Guidebook of Southeast Asian Coins and Currency. Volume I: France (3rd ed.). BNR Press. ISBN 978-0-931960-01-7.
