= Machi =

Machi (Japanese: 町, Hepburn: machi, also read as chō) is an administrative unit in Japan, often referred to in English as town. In Japanese and other languages, it may also refer to:

== Places ==
- Machi, Iran, a village in Hormozgan Province, Iran
- Maji, Ethiopia, a city in southwestern Ethiopia
- Machi, Manipur, India
- Machi, Mardan, Pakistan

== Mythology and religious tradition ==
- Machi (biblical figure), a minor Biblical figure appearing in Numbers 13:15
- Machi (shaman), the shaman of the Mapuche indigenous culture

== Popular culture ==
- Machi (hip hop group), a Taiwanese hip-hop group
  - Machi Esports, a professional multi-gaming organization founded by the hip hop group
- Machi (Hunter × Hunter), a character from the manga series Hunter × Hunter
- Machi (video game), a 1998 video game
- "Machi", a song by Borgeous and Ryos
- Machi (film), a 2004 Indian Tamil-language action film

== Other uses ==
- Machi (name), a given name and surname (including a list of people with the name)
- Machiyar, also known as Machi, a Muslim community in Gujarat, India
- Machi Koro, a Japanese tabletop city-building game

== See also ==
- Malachi (disambiguation)
- Mach 1 (disambiguation) (including Mach-I)
