= Tự Đức Thông Bảo =

Inscription on historical coins in Vietnam

Tự Đức Thông Bảo (嗣德通寶)
- Đại Nam
- Value: Zinc: 6 phần Brass: 6 phần, 7 phần, 9 phần, 6 văn, 1 mạch Silver: 1 tiền, 1.5 tiền, 2 tiền, 3 tiền, 1/4 lạng, 5 tiền, 7 tiền, 1 peso/7 tiền & 2 phân (Note: Equal to 1 Mexican peso.); Gold: 1 tiền, 2 tiền, 3 tiền, 4 tiền, 1 lạng
- Composition: Zinc, Copper-alloys (brass and bronze), Silver, or Gold
- Years of minting: 1847–1883

Obverse
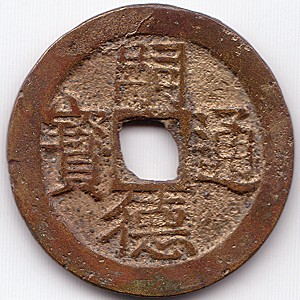
- Design: Tự Đức Thông Bảo (嗣德通寶)

Reverse

Tự Đức Thông Bảo (chữ Hán: 嗣德通寶) was an inscription used on different coins made from various metals and alloys during the reign of Emperor Tự Đức of the Nguyễn dynasty of Vietnam. The coinage of Tự Đức saw the introduction of the term văn (文) which was an accounting unit used for copper-alloy cash coins denominating their worth in number of zinc cash coins with a weight of 6 phần.

These coins circulated alongside another series of issued under Emperor Tự Đức, the Tự Đức Bảo Sao.

== History ==
The sapèqueries (minting houses) of Đại Nam under Emperor Tự Đức were operated by the Hanoi Office of Current Money (河內通寶局, "Hà-Nội Thông Bảo Cục") which replaced the former Office of Currency (Bảo Tuyền Cục) and the Capital Office of Currency (Bảo Hoá Kinh Cục), and the main sapèqueries were located in Huế while mints were also in operation in Hanoi, Sơn Tây, and Bắc Ninh. The Tổng Đốc had the authority to give permits to Chinese merchants to create foundries in Sơn Tây to produce zinc cash coins that bear the inscription Tự Đức Thông Bảo, but these Chinese merchants may not produce more than a thousand strings of cash at a time.

=== Metal and currency shortages under Tự Đức ===
Vietnam has always suffered from a natural shortage of copper, the copper mines in operation were usually owned by companies from China and produced very little copper. Tự Đức had attempted to increase the production of copper and zinc mines in his empire and resorted to hire Chinese contractors for the exploitation of the zinc mines of the province of Thái Nguyên. In many places like in Hanoi the government resorted to purchase copper utensils from the population in order to produce a sufficient number of cash coins for the economy. Around 1871 various bands of pirates and the Zhuang bandit group the Black Flag Army started taking over the mines of Northern Đại Nam causing the price of all metals to inflate leading to the cessation of the production of zinc cash coins in Đại Nam while copper had to be imported from other countries to continue to produce Tự Đức Thông Bảo cash coins. In August 1874 the government started collecting copper, tin, and zinc from the military and shipped the copper and zinc (to make brass) to the sapèqueries of Hanoi for the production of cash coins while the tin was sent to Thừa Thiên Phủ to be traded for other metals.

After the government started increasing the exchange rates between zinc and copper while lowering the copper content of the brass cash coins the people started hoarding all the "good coins" or melting them down to make utensils which was publicly denounced by the minister of finance Ngụy Khắc Tuần. Another common problem that Chinese merchants were illegally bringing Vietnamese cash coins to China as the Vietnamese government had prohibited the export of cash coins from Đại Nam with the notable exception of small amounts of zinc cash coins as it was only legally allowed to take ten strings of zinc cash coins out of the country (one string of cash coins at the time consisted of 600 coins) or thirty strings of zinc cash for those travelling to French Cochinchina which had previously belonged to Đại Nam.

It was forbidden for cash coins that carry a Vietnamese Niên Hiệu to be exported to other countries and merchant ships regardless if they were Vietnamese or Chinese were halted to be inspected for any illegal exports and were subject to confiscation. Despite these measures Chinese merchants kept smuggling out Vietnamese cash coins to re-melt in China with an alloy of lead and zinc to resell them in Đại Nam for a profit which was a major problem for the Vietnamese economy. In the province of Bình Thuận brass and zinc cash coins had become a severe rarity.

=== Illegal and private production of cash coins under Tự Đức ===
As the government didn't produce enough money for the Vietnamese market it permitted the private production of cash coins and deliberately dissolved its own monopoly on the creation of zinc and brass Tự Đức Thông Bảo cash coins as a measure to increase the national money supply. The government also made it illegal for coins with an older Niên Hiệu to circulate but allowed for coins with what they consider to be "pseudo-Niên Hiệu's" (those with inscriptions from the Tây Sơn dynasty, as the Nguyễn didn't regard them as a legitimate dynasty) to continue circulating.

Despite the fact that the government greatly encouraged private mints and laws guaranteeing that the coinage they cast were up to code, they were rarely audited and the mints operated by the Chinese became a dispensary for fraudulent coinage. Chinese mining companies were also authorised to cast zinc coinages if they would also pay their taxes to the government of Đại Nam in zinc. The government of the province of Bình Định requested the central government to immediately allow them to cast their own cash coins and open 4 sapèqueries and legalise private casting which were all granted, though the production of cash coins had to be halted on three occasions as the coins they produced were of inferior quality but as the province had previously suffered from a complete cessation of currency circulation the government allowed these cash coins to circulate but they would simply adjust the tax rates for Bình Định.

Around this time a large amount of counterfeit Tự Đức Thông Bảo cash coins of inferior were being produced abroad, especially in the Qing dynasty provinces of Guangdong and Guangxi as well as in Macau, Hong Kong, and Cochinchina. Even bad quality coins with the inscription Minh Mạng Thông Bảo of inferior quality were being cast in Macau in order to sell them to the Vietnamese for a profit. In many cases Vietnamese high officials were aiding those that were producing false coinage, in one case one of Tự Đức’s gunboats, the Bouranne was attempted to be filled with a large amount of fake cash coins while stationed in Hong Kong, but the plot to smuggle these coins into Đại Nam was uncovered by the Vietnamese authorities though the producers of the coins were acquitted in Hong Kong as they had stated that the coins were intended for the Vietnamese market.

== Zinc cash coins ==
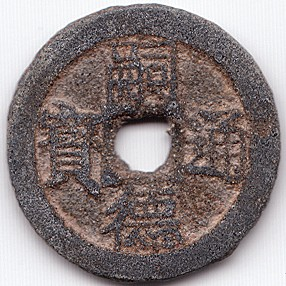
A zinc Tự Đức Thông Bảo coin of 6 phần.

The zinc cash coins of the Tự Đức bore the obverse inscription Tự Đức Thông Bảo (嗣德通寶) and usually had blank reverses while some zinc Tự Đức Thông Bảo may also carry the mintmark of their place of origin written from right to left such as "河內" for Hanoi and "山西" for the province of Sơn Tây. The zinc cash coins with the mint mark "Hanoi" were produced at the Bắc Thành workshop.

During the Tự Đức period the zinc Tự Đức Thông Bảo was both the smallest denomination and the base of the entire currency system, the zinc cash coin had become legal tender in every province of Đại Nam since the beginning of the Nguyễn dynasty and under the reign of Emperor Minh Mạng was standardised at a weight of 6 phần. The brass currency of previous dynasties that circulated in Đại Nam prior to the introduction of these zinc coins completely disappeared from the market. The casting of zinc Tự Đức Thông Bảo cash coins started since the first year of the reign of Tự Đức and maintained the same standards as the preceding zinc Minh Mạng Thông Bảo (明命通寶) cash coins. In 1869 Nguyễn Bỉnh who was both the director of the monetary workshop of Hanoi and the governor of Hanoi proposed the idea of creating a zinc coin of 5 phần, but this proposal was rejected because the Ministry of Finance did not believe that a zinc coin this small and brittle would circulate well as it would be damaged quite easily.

"With sapèques of zinc and their great brittleness each day great quantities were lost. When the weak bond of the snap ring, which joins them together, has suddenly broken, it spreads them on the ground and a great number are broken. When the owner of considerable sum piles it up out of a package of ten ligatures they will find a great number broken. And metal is less resistant to oxidation which corrodes it with incredible power of destruction… under the pitiless climate of Indo-China.”

— J. Silvestre, Monnaies et de Médailles de l'Annam et de la Cochinchine Française (1883)

The production of zinc cash coins probably stopped around the year 1871 as it was too expensive to maintain its production, the government of Đại Nam did not have any access to zinc mines as they were being blocked by Chinese pirates which would make it costly to try and acquire the resources necessary for their production. Zinc cash coins have always been a major source of irritation for the government as they were very heavy compared to their intrinsic value making them difficult to transport in larger quantities and were also weak and easily damaged due to their brittle nature. The transport of the zinc cash coins itself was a liability as it was not uncommon for strings to break and the coins to fall into pieces as they hit the road, but as these zinc coins were used to pay the salaries of government workers they were deemed necessary but eventually every were completely phased out in favour of the lighter and strong brass coinage though they would remain essential to the general population of Đại Nam for small transactions.

== Brass cash coins ==
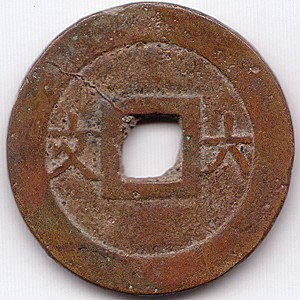
A Tự Đức Thông Bảo (嗣德通寶) cash coin with the reverse inscription "六文" (Lục Văn) indicating that it was worth six pieces of zinc cash coins.

The brass Tự Đức Thông Bảo cash coins started being produced during the first year of the reign of Emperor Tự Đức, under the preceding emperors Minh Mạng and Thiệu Trị there were brass cash coins of 6 phần and 9 phần cast. In Vietnamese these cash coins are always referred to as "Ðồng" (銅, copper) despite the fact that they were always made from Copper-alloys such as brass or bronze, this mistakenly leads to many French sources referring to them as "copper coins". During the Nguyễn dynasty the value of these brass coins compared to that of zinc coins would increase over time, under Gia Long a brass Gia Long Thông Bảo (嘉隆通寶) cash coin was only worth 1.2 zinc Gia Long Thông Bảo cash coins, under Emperor Minh Mạng a single brass cash coin was worth three zinc ones, while in 1848 a 6 phần brass cash coin was only worth two zinc cash coins of the same weight, a decade later however they were worth four zinc cash coins.

As the brass coinage had higher purchasing power than the zinc cash coins they were deemed to be paramount to the economy, though at the beginning of the Tự Đức copper coinage had become rare outside of the provinces surrounding Huế. As much copper was recovered from the drainage canals of Trang Liệt the first brass coins had a composition of 60% copper. Around the time that the Tự Đức Bảo Sao (嗣德寶鈔) was produced the copper content of the alloys of the brass Tự Đức Thông Bảo was reduced to 50% as this coincided with the introduction of high denomination coins with low intrinsic values. In January 1868 the imperial government of Đại Nam passed a decree that fixed the exchange rate between brass and zinc cash coins to 1:6, this decree also introduced the introduction of the reverse inscription "Lục Văn" (六文, 6 pieces, as in 6 zinc cash coins) which drastically changed the relationship between zinc and brass coins as this had now created a standardised exchange rate increasing the value of the brass coinage which had previously only had a value of 4 zinc coins per 6 phần of brass. At the time many both foreign and local made counterfeits of Vietnamese Tự Đức Thông Bảo cash coins circulated that were often composed of inferior alloys and these coins only had a market value of 3 zinc Tự Đức Thông Bảo cash coins.

== Exchange rate between brass and zinc cash coins ==
As the Đại Nam had a severe lack of copper mines even during this period where the official exchange rates the actual exchange rates fluctuated enormously, in 1876 one could even get 60 zinc cash coins for a single brass one making 10 brass coins equal to a single quán of zinc coins.

The exchange rates set by decrees of the government of Đại Nam are:

Weight	Percentage of copper	Percentage of zinc	Year	Value in number of zinc cash coins
6 phần	60%	40%	1848	2
9 phần	60%	40%	1848	3
6 phần	60%	40%	1858	3
9 phần	60%	40%	1858	4
6 phần	60 %	40%	1868	4
9 phần	60%	40%	1868	6
6 phần	50%	50%	Circa 1870	4
9 phần	50%	50%	Circa 1870	6
7 phần	50%	50%	1872	6
6 phần	50%	50%	1879	6

== List of variants of low denomination Tự Đức Thông Bảo cash coins ==
List of Tự Đức Thông Bảo cash coins with a nominal value lower than 10 văn:

Inscription (chữ Hán)	Denomination	Composition	Diameter	Toda image	Toda number, Barker number(s), (Note: From Dr. R. Allen Barker’s book.) Schroeder number (Note: From Annam Études Numismatiques by Albert Schroeder.)	Obverse image	Reverse image
Tự Đức Thông Bảo (嗣德通寶)	None	Copper mixed with tin	24~25 mm		Toda #231, Barker #103.1–103.2, Schroeder #		
Tự Đức Thông Bảo (嗣德通寶)	None	Copper or lead	22~23.8 mm		Toda #232, Barker #103.6–103.8, Schroeder #		
Tự Đức Thông Bảo (嗣德通寶)	None	Zinc		None	Toda None, Barker #, Schroeder #		
Tự Đức Thông Bảo, with four crescents around the square centre hole (嗣德通寶)	None	Zinc			Toda #233, Barker None, Schroeder None		
Tự Đức Thông Bảo - Lục Văn (嗣德通寶 - 六文) (Note: Note that Eduardo Toda y Güell incorrectly names this inscription as "六分" (Lục Phần) in his book Annam and its Minor Currency.)	6 văn	Copper mixed with tin	24~26 mm		Toda #234, Barker #103.3–103.5, Schroeder #303		
Tự Đức Thông Bảo - Lục Văn (嗣德通寶 - 六文)	6 văn	Copper-alloy	23 mm	None	Toda None, Barker #103.3–103.5, Schroeder #302		
Tự Đức Thông Bảo – Hà Nội (嗣德通寶 - 河內) (Note: With the Chinese characters "河內" written small.)	8 văn	Zinc			Toda #235, Barker #103.9–103.10, Schroeder #297		
Tự Đức Thông Bảo – Hà Nội (嗣德通寶 - 河內) (Note: With the Chinese characters "河內" written big.)	8 văn	Zinc		None	Toda None, Barker #103.9–103.10, Schroeder #298		
Tự Đức Thông Bảo – Sơn Tây (嗣德通寶 - 山西)	8 văn	Zinc		None	Toda None, Barker #103.9–103.10, Schroeder #299		

== Trial machine-struck cash coins by Dietrich Uhlhorn ==
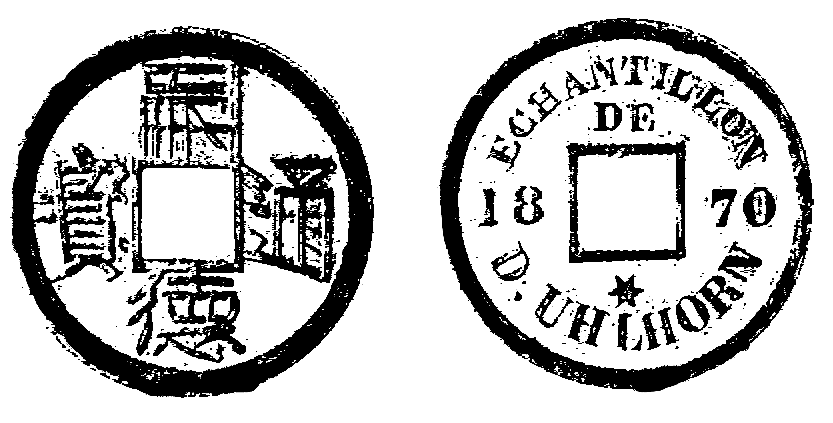
A sample machine-struck Tự Đức Thông Bảo (嗣德通寳) cash coin from 1870 made by D. Uhlhorn in Grevenbroich, Prussia, North Germany.

A company in Grevenbroich, Prussia originally founded by Diedrich Uhlhorn and at the time run by his son Heinrich Uhlhorn attempted to produce a machine-struck Tự Đức Thông Bảo cash coin, the pattern coin shows the manufacture date of 1870 although it is uncertain if the coin was actually produced in this year as no records mention it, the obverse inscription reads "Tự Đức Thông Bảo", the Chinese calligraphy on the coin comes very close for a person with no skills in writing Chinese characters as the coin was produced in North Germany. While the reverse inscription reads "ECHANTILLON DE D. UHLHORN 1870" (Sample coin of D. Uhlhorn, 1870). The coin weighs 4 grams to match the Vietnamese weight of 10 phần which is 3.7783 grams. As it was deemed too expensive to ship these coins from North Germany to Saigon in French Cochinchina the effort to privately produce these coins was discontinued and all subsequent machine-struck cash coins produced were made by the French government. It is possible that the coin was a test strike for Nguyễn Ðức Hậu who requested the court of the Nguyễn dynasty permission to purchase coin presses from Europe to produce machine-struck coins but this request was ultimate turned down by the court. During this same period machine presses were being imported into the Qing dynasty where machine-struck cash coins would later become a common sight, while in Vietnam this wouldn't happen until the introduction of the Machine-struck Khải Định Thông Bảo (啓定通寶) in 1921.

== Silver coins with the inscription Tự Đức Thông Bảo ==
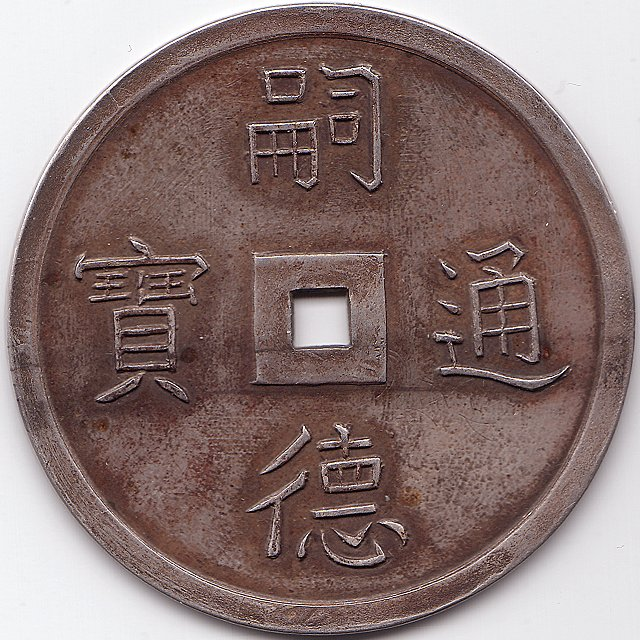
A silver Tự Đức Thông Bảo coin of 7 tiền.

The Treaty of Saigon of 1862 demanded that the government of the Nguyễn dynasty would have to pay the sum of four million Mexican pesos to the French Empire, initially the Nguyễn dynasty was able to secure silver funds domestically but after only a short period the domestic silver reserves were depleted and the government of Đại Nam decided to cast their own national version of the Mexican peso, Tự Đức gathered his ministers in secret to know the terms of the payments to France which at the time was a biannual payment of two-hundred thousand Mexican pesos for ten years, so Tự Đức ordered the creation of a Vietnamese peso with the inscription "Tự Đức Thông Bảo" (嗣德通寳) on its obverse and "Thất tiền nhị phân" (七錢二分) on its reverse that had a silver content of 80%, an envoy from the province of Gia Định asked if these coins would be acceptable for payment to the French, but the French rejected the offer as Mexican pesos had a silver content of 90.3% as opposed to the 80% of the Vietnamese peso coin.

Besides the silver coins, Tự Đức also produced silver ingots with the inscription Tự Đức Niên Tạo (嗣德年造) in the denominations 7 mạch, 1 quán, 1 quán & 5 mạch, 2 quán, 2 quán & 5 mạch, and 3 quán.

== See also ==
- Bảo Đại Thông Bảo
