= Mache =

Mache may refer to:

== Food ==
- Mâche, French name of the edible salad green Valerianella locusta, also known as corn salad and lamb's lettuce
- Mache (food), Filipino rice flour balls flavored with pandan

== People ==
- Heinrich Mache, Austrian physicist
- François-Bernard Mâche, French composer
- Karl Mache, German politician

== Places ==
- Mache District, a district of Otuzco province, Peru
- Mache River, a river that enters the Pacific in the north of Ecuador

== Other ==
- Papier-mâché, a composite material consisting primarily of paper pieces or pulp
- Mache (unit), an obsolete unit of measurement of volumic radioactivity, named for Heinrich Mache

== See also ==
- Mach3 (disambiguation)
- Ford Mach-E, an all-electric battery-powered crossover SUV
