= List of scientists whose names are used as units =

Many scientists have been recognized with the assignment of their names as international units by the International Committee for Weights and Measures or as non-SI units. The International System of Units (abbreviated SI from French: Système international d'unités) is the most widely used system of units of measurement. There are 7 base units and 22 derived units (excluding compound units). These units are used both in science and in commerce. Two of the base SI units and 17 of the derived units are named after scientists. 28 non-SI units are named after scientists. By this convention, their names are immortalised. As a rule, the SI units are written in lowercase letters, but symbols of units derived from the name of a person begin with a capital letter.

== Scientists and SI units ==
Base unit (Note: There are 5 base units that are not named after people: kilogram, metre, second, mole and candela.)	Derived unit

(colour legend)

Name	Life	Nationality	Quantity	SI unit	Image
André-Marie Ampère	1775–1836	(France) French	Electric current	ampere (A) (Base unit)	
William Thomson, 1st Baron Kelvin	1824–1907	(United Kingdom) British ( (Scotland) Scottish, (Northern Ireland) Northern Irish)	Thermodynamic temperature	kelvin (K) (Base unit)	
Blaise Pascal	1623–1662	(France) French	Pressure	pascal (Pa)	
Isaac Newton	1643–1727	(United Kingdom) British ( (England) English)	Force	newton (N)	
Anders Celsius	1701–1744	(Sweden) Swedish	Temperature	degree Celsius (°C)	
Charles-Augustin de Coulomb	1736–1806	(France) French	Electric charge	coulomb (C)	
James Watt	1736–1819	(United Kingdom) British ( (Scotland) Scottish)	Power	watt (W)	
Alessandro Volta	1745–1827	(Italy) Italian	Electric potential	volt (V)	
Georg Simon Ohm	1789–1855	(Germany) German	Electrical resistance	ohm (Ω)	
Michael Faraday	1791–1867	(United Kingdom) British ( (England) English)	Capacitance	farad (F)	
Joseph Henry	1797–1878	(United States) American	Inductance	henry (H)	
Wilhelm Eduard Weber	1804–1891	(Germany) German	Magnetic flux	weber (Wb)	
Ernst Werner von Siemens	1816–1892	(Germany) German	Conductance	siemens (S)	
James Prescott Joule	1818–1889	(United Kingdom) British ( (England) English)	Energy	joule (J)	
Antoine Henri Becquerel	1852–1908	(France) French	Radioactivity	becquerel (Bq)	
Nikola Tesla	1856–1943	(Serbia) Serbian (Note: The village he was born was a part of Austrian Empire, now it is in Croatia.)- (United States) American	Magnetic flux density	tesla (T)	
Heinrich Rudolf Hertz	1857–1894	(Germany) German	Frequency	hertz (Hz)	
Rolf Maximilian Sievert	1896–1966	(Sweden) Swedish	Dose equivalent of radiation	sievert (Sv)	
Louis Harold Gray	1905–1965	(United Kingdom) British ( (England) English)	Absorbed dose of radiation	gray (Gy)	

== Scientists and non-SI units ==
Name of the scientist	Life	Nationality	Quantity	Unit (Note: As a rule, the units are written in lowercase letters. But, symbols of units derived from a personal name always begin with a capital letter.)	Image
William Gilbert	1544–1603	(United Kingdom) British ( (England) English)	Magnetomotive force	gilbert (Gi)	
John Napier	1550–1617	(United Kingdom) British ( (Scotland) Scottish)	Magnitude (ln, dimensionless)	neper (Np)	
Galileo Galilei	1564–1642	(Italy) Italian	Acceleration	gal (Gal)	
Evangelista Torricelli	1608–1647	(Italy) Italian	Pressure	torr (Torr)	
René Réaumur	1683–1757	(France) French	Temperature	degree Reaumur (°R)	
Daniel Gabriel Fahrenheit	1686–1736	(Poland) Polish, (Netherlands) Dutch, (Germany) German	Temperature	degree Fahrenheit (°F)	
Johann Heinrich Lambert	1728–1777	(Germany) German	Luminance	lambert (L)	
John Dalton	1766–1844	(United Kingdom) British	Mass (atomic)	dalton (Da)	
Hans Christian Ørsted	1777–1851	(Denmark) Danish	Magnetic field	oersted (Oe)	
Johann Carl Friedrich Gauss	1777–1855	(Germany) German	Magnetic flux density	gauss (G)	
Michael Faraday	1791–1867	(United Kingdom) British ( (England) English)	Electric charge	faraday (F)	
Jean Léonard Marie Poiseuille	1797–1869	(France) French	Dynamic viscosity	poise (P)	
Anders Jonas Ångström	1814–1874	(Sweden) Swedish	Length	angstrom (Å)	
Sir George Stokes, 1st Baronet	1818–1903	(United Kingdom) British	Kinematic viscosity	stokes (St)	
William John Macquorn Rankine	1820–1872	(United Kingdom) British ( (Scotland) Scottish)	Thermodynamic temperature	degree Rankine (°Ra )	
James Clerk Maxwell	1831–1879	(United Kingdom) British ( (Scotland) Scottish)	Magnetic flux	maxwell (Mx)	
Samuel Pierpont Langley	1834–1906	(United States) American	Energy intensity	langley (Ly)	
Ernst Mach	1838–1916	(Austria) Austrian	Speed	Mach number (M)	
John Strutt, 3rd Baron Rayleigh	1842–1919	(United Kingdom) British	Acoustic impedance	rayl	
Wilhelm Röntgen	1845–1923	(Germany) German	Ionizing radiation	röntgen (R)	
Alexander Graham Bell	1847–1922	(United Kingdom) British ( (Scotland) Scottish), (United States) American	Magnitude (log_{10}, dimensionless)	bel (B)	
Loránd Eötvös	1848–1919	(Hungary) Hungarian	Gravitational gradient	eotvos (E)	
Heinrich Kayser	1853–1940	(Germany) German	Wavenumber	kayser	
Joseph John Thomson	1856–1940	(United Kingdom) British ( (England) English)	Mass-to-charge ratio	thomson (Th)	
Marie Curie Pierre Curie	1867–1934 1859–1906	(Poland) Polish, (France) French	Radioactivity	curie (Ci)	
Heinrich Mache	1876–1954	(Austria) Austrian	Radioactivity	Mache (ME)	
Peter Debye	1884–1966	(Netherlands) Dutch	Electric dipole moment	debye (D)	
Karl Guthe Jansky	1905–1950	(United States) American	Spectral irradiance	jansky (JY)	
Wallace Clement Sabine	1868–1919	(United States) American	Sound absorption	sabin	

== See also ==
- List of chemical elements named after people
- List of scientists whose names are used in physical constants

== Bibliography ==
- "Essentials of the SI".
- Gordon England. "Derived SI units with special names".
- Asimov, Isaac (1972). Asimov's Biographical Encyclopedia of Science and Technology. London: Pan Books. ISBN 0-330-24323-3.
- İnan, Kemal (1978). Elektrik Mühendisliği (259-260) : Elektrik. Ankara: TBMMO EMO Yayın organı.
- Hugh Young, Roger Freedman. University Physics. Addison Wesley. ISBN 0-321-50130-6.
- Eric W. Weisstein. "Kelvin, Lord William Thomson (1824–1907)". Wolfram Research.
- Alfred Ruppert Hall. "Isaac Newton's Life". Isaac Newton Institute for Mathematical Sciences. Archived from the original on 28 May 2014.
- "Anders Celsius (1701–1744)". Uppsala University.
- "Charles Augustin de Coulomb (French physicists)". Encyclopædia Britannica.
- "Coulomb". Encyclopædia Britannica.
- "Ohm (unit)". The Free Dictionary by Farlex.
- "Michael Faraday". Famous Physicists and Astronomers.
- "Joseph Henry". The national academy of sciences. Archived from the original on 9 December 2006.
- "Weber, Wilhelm" . New International Encyclopedia. Vol. XX. 1905.
- "Siemens, Werner von". Encyclopædia Britannica.
- "Siemens (unit)". Medlib.
- "Biography:James Presacott Joule". Oracle ThinkQuest. Archived from the original on 21 October 2012.
- "Henri Becquerel". Nobelprize.org.
- Dr.Ljubo Vujović. "Tesla's Biography". Tesla Memorial Society of New York.
- "Tesla Unit". Tesla Memorial Society of New York.
- "Heinrich Hertz". Biograhpicon.
- "Hertz". University of California, Berkeley.
- Mariann Eklund. "Rolf Sievert, the man and the unit". Karolinska Institutet.
- "About L.G.Gray". L.G.Gray Memorial Trust. Archived from the original on 24 April 2016.
- "Decibel". NDT resource center. Archived from the original on 15 February 2014.
