= Macho (disambiguation) =

To be macho is to possess machismo or exaggerated masculinity.

Macho may also refer to:

== Arts and entertainment ==
- Macho (band), a short-lived Italian-American disco/R&B group in the late 1970s
- Macho (album), a 1975 album by Hungarian guitarist Gábor Szabó
- "El Macho", a song on the Sailing to Philadelphia album by Mark Knopfler
- Macho, original title of the 1975 novel Cry Macho
- El Macho, a 1977 Italian-Argentine Spaghetti Western film
- Macho (film), a 2016 Mexican film
- the title character of the 1970 Civil War film Macho Callahan, played by David Janssen
- Macho Grubba, villain of Paper Mario The Thousand Year Door
- Super Macho Man, re-accuring character from Punch-Out!! series
- Eduardo "El Macho" Perez, the main antagonist of the 2013 animated feature film Despicable Me 2

== People ==
- Macho (surname), a list of people
- Macho (nickname), a list of people nicknamed "Macho" or "El Macho"

== Science and technology ==
- Massive compact halo object (MACHO), a hypothesised astronomical body to explain the dark matter in galaxy halos
  - MACHO Project, an observational search for MACHOs
- Mach-O, binary file format on Mach-kernel systems
- Marine Cable Hosted Observatory (MACHO), an underwater seismic monitoring network

== Other uses ==
- Toyota Land Cruiser (J40) (Toyota Macho in Venezuela), a four-wheel-drive vehicle
- Bursera glabrifolia, a Mexican tree called macho in woodcarving
- "El macho", a pair of percussive claves' striking clave
- Río Macho, a river in Vázquez de Coronado, Costa Rica

== See also ==
- Machos (disambiguation)
- Mach O (disambiguation)
- Macho man (disambiguation)
