= Tự Đức Bảo Sao =

Historical Vietnamese currency

Tự Đức Bảo Sao (嗣德寶鈔)
- Đại Nam
- Value: 10 văn, 20 văn, 30 văn, 40 văn, 50 văn, 60 văn, 2 mạch, 3 mạch, 8 mạch, 9 mạch, and 1 quán
- Composition: Copper-alloy (brass)
- Years of minting: 1861–1883

Obverse
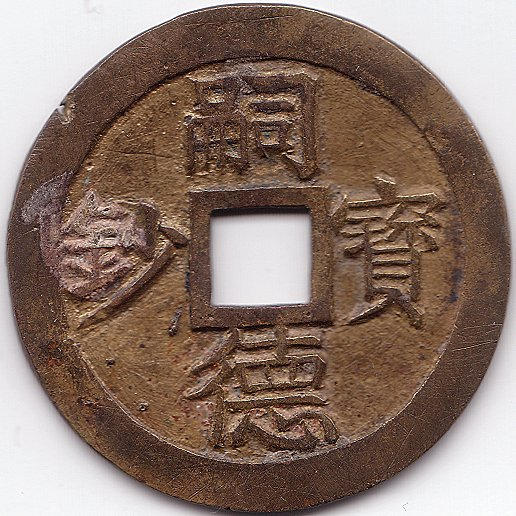
- Design: Tự Đức Bảo Sao (嗣德寶鈔)

Reverse
- Design: See below

The Tự Đức Bảo Sao (chữ Hán: 嗣德寶鈔) was a series of large denomination Vietnamese cash coins produced under the reign of Emperor Tự Đức from 1861 to complement the contemporary Tự Đức Thông Bảo (嗣德通寶) copper and zinc cash coins with larger nominal values. These coins were very badly received by the general population as their intrinsic value was relatively low compared to their nominal value and for this reason the Vietnamese government reduced the value of a single Tiền to 50 văn and allowed these coins to be used for the payment of taxes.

The Tự Đức Bảo Sao is the first Vietnamese cash coin series that uses the denomination văn (文) replacing the earlier weight based denomination of phân (分).

== History ==
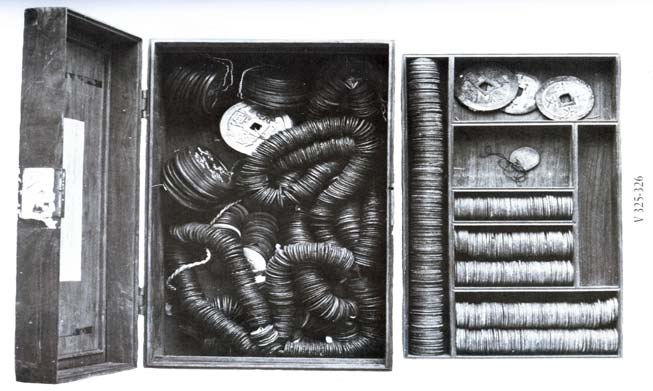
A payment box seized in the Bình Định Province in the year 1884 containing multiple strings of Tự Đức Bảo Sao cash coins and strings of lower denomination cash coins.

The Tự Đức Bảo Sao or Đồng Sao (銅鈔, billets of copper) were introduced by the Ministry of Revenue (戸部, Hộ Bộ) in the year Tự Đức 14 (1961) for large transactions and taxes on behalf of stores of the government of Đại Nam, the introduction of the Tự Đức Bảo Sao marked the redefinition of the tiền or mạch denominations and the quàn (strings of cash coins) where the quàn was made equal to 10 mạch and the mạch was made the equivalent of 60 zinc cash coins, under these exchange rates 1 quàn was worth a string of 600 zinc cash coins. The Đồng Sao series of cash coins was introduced as zinc cash coins were heavy in quantity to carry around for the payment of larger sums of money, to this end the government introduced a system of monetary units determined by their nominal value in zinc cash coins as opposed to their intrinsic market value, it is possible that this might have been inspired by contemporary Chinese coinage of the Xianfeng era in the Qing dynasty where large denomination coins from 4 up to 1000 văn circulated alongside each other with little to no difference in intrinsic value in a fiduciary system, this system was also used by the Vietnamese. When the Tự Đức Bảo Sao was first proposed the Mandarins of the imperial court of Đại Nam suggested to simply increase the weight of the brass Tự Đức Thông Bảo to make them worth more relative to the zinc Tự Đức Thông Bảo cash coins as 1 brass cash coin with a weight of 9 phần was worth four zinc cash coins. The value of the Đồng Sao cash coins was indicated on the reverses of the coins expressed in their worth in zinc cash coins preceded by the character 準 (chuẩn, regarded as equal to), despite the fact that Sao (鈔) means "paper money", though imperfectly the denominations of these coins attempted to take the respective value of brass and zinc cash coins into account which means that they can't be fully qualified as a fiat currency. The Ministry of Revenue of Đại Nam originally set the exchange rate between the brass Tự Đức Bảo Sao and zinc cash coins heavily in favour of the larger denominations which wasn't accepted by the market which resulted in the imperial court attempting to adjust the exchange rate more to the contemporary exchange values of brass and zinc cash coins that were in circulation. In January 1868 by decree the exchange rate between brass 9 phần cash and zinc cash coins was fixed 1:4 replacing the early ratio of 1:2.67 that had been in place since 1858. The Tự Đức Bảo Sao was generally well received by the population of Đại Nam despite the fact that their circulation was reduced due to their high purchasing power relative to their intrinsic value until their weight was decreased, which was done by the government to conform to the new official exchange between brass and zinc cash coins.

From September 1870 the Tự Đức Bảo Sao series of cash coins has had their weight decreased, but kept the same nominal values and denominations. 80% of the Tự Đức Bảo Sao cash coins produced in the 1870 series were of the 60 văn denomination. The ratio in the alloy between copper and zinc of this series was highly irregular with the coins of 10 văn being 25% copper and 75% zinc while the coins of 60 văn were only 11.1% copper and 88.9% zinc. A decree enacted in 1870 halved the market value of zinc cash coins which maximised the profitability the government was making on the production of the Tự Đức Bảo Sao as they were low in weight relative to their nominal value. These new policies caused the Tự Đức Bảo Sao to fail however as the population were unhappy with these coins which were already little used, as these newer coins of decreased weight were rejected by the people they had to be re-melted as they were only used when people were forced to by the politicians. These coins were abandoned almost immediately after their manufacture and were rarely held by private individuals, they were however held in large quantities by metal founders and antique merchants especially in places like Hanoi where there were a lot of Europeans.

The other series of Tự Đức Bảo Sao cash coins is not denominated in văn (number of cash coins) but in accounting units like mạch (陌) and quán (貫, "strings of cash coins"), unlike the previous coins denominated in văn these coins could be considered to be a fiat currency. This series of the Tự Đức Bảo Sao is not mentioned in the contemporary Vietnamese annals. The intrinsic value of these coins is often only ten times as high as the lower denomination cash coins while their nominal value is a hundred times higher, it is possible that these coins were not introduced as their nominal value would be too different from the current system to be accepted by the population.

== Reading of the reverse inscriptions ==
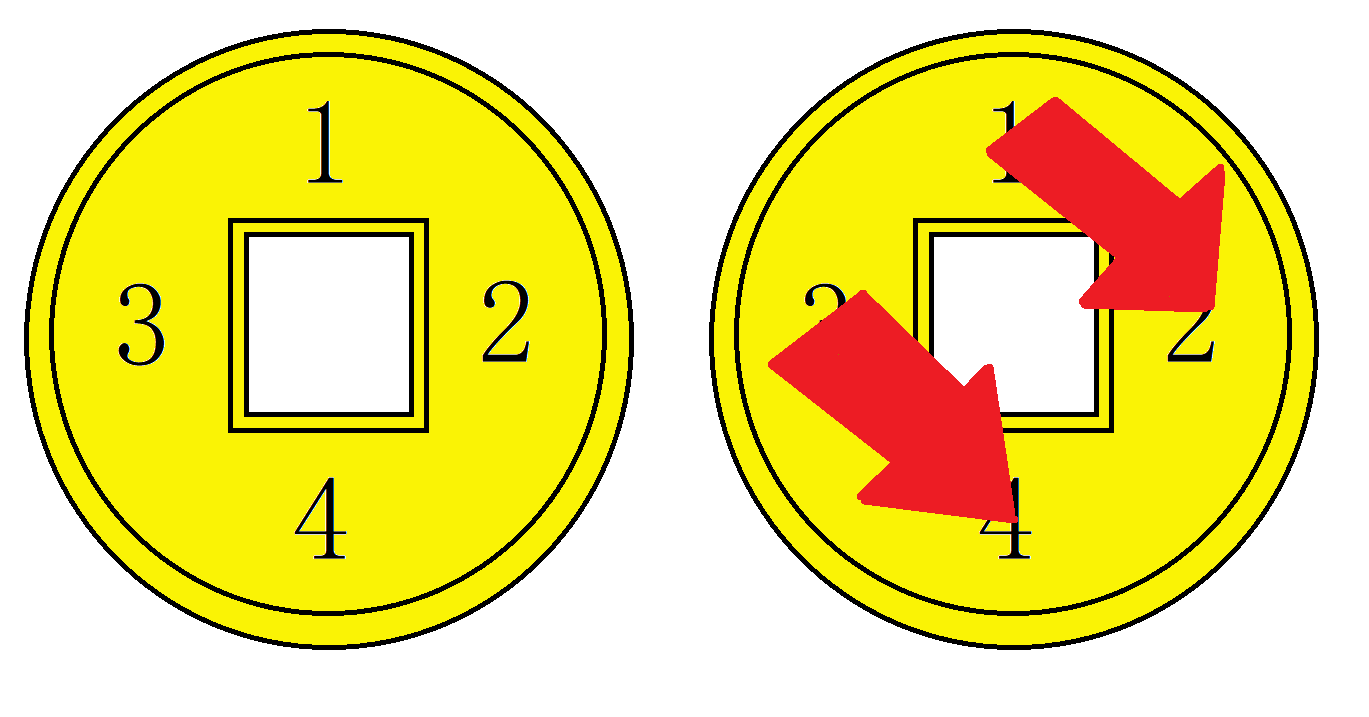
The unorthodox method used for reading the reverse side of most Tự Đức Bảo Sao (嗣德寶鈔) cash coins.

The reverse side of the Tự Đức Bảo Sao are read in an unorthodox way, as usually cash coins are read top-bottom-right-left (known as "a cross pattern"), as is the case for the obverse of this series. This isn't the case with the reverse which are read in the order of top (12 o’clock), right (3 o’clock), left (9 o’clock), and then bottom (6 o’clock). For example, the 60 văn coin's reverse is read Chuẩn lục thập văn (準六十文), rather than Chuẩn văn lục thập (準文六十), though the incorrect reading was advanced by some authors like Lacroix and is used in sources like the catalogue of currencies in the collection of the Bibliothèque nationale de France.

French author Albert Schroeder referenced the correct reading being mentioned in a decree issued in 1861 by the government of the Nguyễn dynasty.

The Tự Đức Bảo Sao with nominal values higher than 60 văn have reverse inscriptions that are read in the typical manner (top-bottom-right-left), for example Chuẩn đang nhị mạch (準當二陌) rather than Chuẩn nhị đang mạch (準二當陌) if read using the above method.

== List of Tự Đức Bảo Sao cash coins ==
List of large denomination cash coins issued under Emperor Tự Đức:

Denomination	chữ Hán (reverse inscription)	Years of mintage	Weight	Toda image	Image
10 văn	準十文 (Chuẩn thập văn)	1861	5.66 g.	None	
10 văn	準一十文 (Chuẩn nhất thập văn)	1870	5.66 g.	None	
20 văn	準二十文 (Chuẩn nhị thập văn)	1861–1870	11.33 g.	None	
30 văn	準三十文 (Chuẩn tam thập văn)	1861–1870		None	
40 văn	準四十文 (Chuẩn tứ thập văn)	1870	12.20 g.	None	
50 văn	準五十文 (Chuẩn ngũ thập văn)	1861	23.40 g.		
50 văn	準五十文 (Chuẩn ngũ thập văn)	1870	12.75 g.		
60 văn	準六十文 (Chuẩn lục thập văn)	1870	12.20 g.		
2 mạch (120 văn)	準當二陌 (Chuẩn đang nhị mạch)	1870	20.52 g.	None	
3 mạch (180 văn)	準當三陌 (Chuẩn đang tam mạch)	1870		None	
8 mạch (480 văn)	準當八陌 (Chuẩn đang bát mạch)	1870	35.4 g.	None	
9 mạch (540 văn)	準當九陌 (Chuẩn đang cửu mạch)	1870	28.03 g.	None	
1 quán	準當一貫 (Chuẩn đang nhất quán)	1870	32.96 g.	None	

== See also ==
- Dangbaekjeon
- Great Qing Treasure Note
- Tenpō Tsūhō
- Khải Định Thông Bảo
- Bảo Đại Thông Bảo
