= Mach 3 =

Mach 3 or variation may refer to:

- Supersonic speed, three times the speed of sound
- M.A.C.H. 3, a 1983 LaserDisc arcade video game
- Mach 3 (1987 video game)
- Fly Castelluccio Mach 3, a paramotor aircraft
- Gillette Mach3, a line of shaving razors
- Kawasaki H1 Mach III, motorcycle
- Abner Jenkins or Mach-3, a Marvel Comics superhero
- MACH 3, a Wharfedale MACH loudspeaker
- Mach III, a program at the youth camp Aviation Challenge
- Mustang Mach III, a 1990 Ford vehicle
- Mach3 CNC controller from Artsoft
- Mach (kernel), version 3.0
- Mach 3, a fair ride

== See also ==
- Ford Mach-E, battery electric SUV
- Mach (disambiguation)
- Mach number,
- Mache (disambiguation)
