= Macho (nickname) =

As a nickname, Macho or El Macho may refer to:

== People nicknamed Macho ==
- Bernard Barker (1917–2009), convicted Watergate burglar and CIA undercover operative
- Héctor Camacho (1962–2012), Puerto Rican boxer nicknamed "Macho Camacho"
- José Roberto Figueroa (born 1959), Honduran retired footballer
- Machito, Cuban Latin jazz musician Francisco Raúl Gutiérrez Grillo (1908–1984), nicknamed "Macho" as a child
- Macho Harris (born 1986), Canadian Football League player
- Orestes López (1908–1991), Cuban musician, composer and bandleader

== People nicknamed El Macho ==
- Fernando Montero (born 1948), Costa Rican retired footballer
- Rónald Mora (born 1961), Costa Rican retired footballer
- Rafael Pascual (born 1970), Spanish volleyball player

== See also ==
- Macho (disambiguation)
- Macho (surname)
- Randy Savage (1952–2011), an American professional wrestler known by the stage name "Macho Man"
