= Mach 7 =

Mach 7 or variation, may refer to:

- Mach number for seven times the speed of sound
  - Hypersonic speed of 7 times the speed of sound
- Mach-VII (Marvel Comics), comic book superhero alter-ego of Marvel Comics character Abner Jenkins
- Wharfedale MACH 7, a loudspeaker in the Wharfedale series MACH

== See also ==
- Mach (disambiguation)
