= Mach 2 =

Mach 2 or variation, may refer to:

- Mach number for twice the speed of sound
  - Supersonic speed of 2 times the speed of sound

== Automotive ==
- Ford Mach 2, a 1967 car; see List of Ford vehicles
- Ford Mustang Mach II, a 1970 car; see List of Ford vehicles
- Kawasaki S2 Mach II, the "Mach II" motorcycle

== Entertainment ==
- Mach-2 (Marvel Comics), comic book superhero alter-ego of Marvel Comics character Abner Jenkins
- M.A.C.H. 2 (IPC Media), comic book character from the comic 2000 AD, see M.A.C.H. 1
- Mach 2 (film), a 2001 U.S. skyjacking disaster film

== Other uses ==
- .17 HM2, the .17-calibre Hornady Mach 2 rimfire bullet
- Mach II, a space cadet program at the youth camp Aviation Challenge
- Fly Castelluccio Mach 2, a paramotor aircraft

== See also ==
- Mach (disambiguation)
- Machii (surname)
