= Mach 4 =

Mach 4 or variant, may refer to:

- Mach number for four times the speed of sound
  - Supersonic speed of 4 times the speed of sound
- MACH-4 (Marvel Comics), a comic book superhero
- Fly Castelluccio Mach 4, a paramotor aircraft
- Kawasaki H2 Mach IV, the "Mach IV" motorcycle
- .17 Mach IV, the .17-calibre Mach IV center-fire rifle bullet
- Mach IV, a personality rating on the rating scale Dark Triad Dirty Dozen
- Mach 4, a version of the Mach microkernel developed at the University of Utah

== See also ==
- Macha (disambiguation)
- Mach (disambiguation)
