= Mach 9 =

Mach 9 or variation, may refer to:

- Mach number for nine times the speed of sound
  - Hypersonic speed of 9 times the speed of sound
- Wharfedale MACH 9, a loudspeaker
- Mach-IX (Marvel Comics), comic book superhero alter-ego of Marvel Comics character Abner Jenkins
- "Mach 9 (nine) is equivalent to 6905.42 miles per hour - Source Google Unit Converter

== See also ==
- Mach (disambiguation)
