= Vietnamese văn (currency unit) =

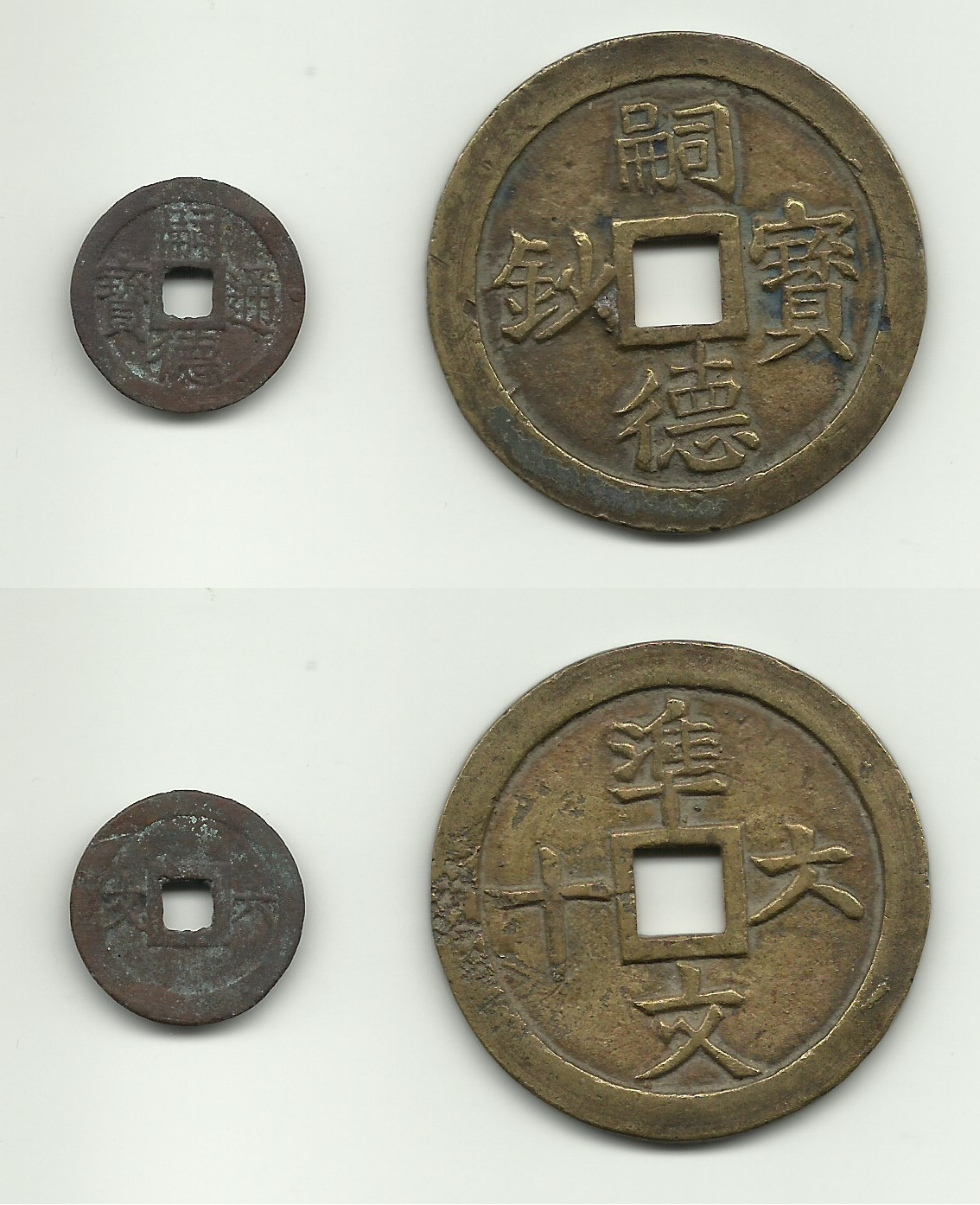
A Tự Đức Thông Bảo (嗣德通寶) with a nominal value of 6 văn and a Tự Đức Bảo Sao (嗣德寶鈔) with a nominal value of 60 văn.

The Vietnamese văn (chữ Hán: 文; French: Sapèque) as a denomination for Vietnamese cash coins was used from 1868 until 1945 during the reign of the Nguyễn dynasty. The inspiration to introduce the văn may have been to emulate the Chinese wén used on contemporary Qing dynasty cash coins which had just become a fiat currency, however unlike the Chinese system where all Chinese cash coins were cast from the same metals and the wén was the primary unit of account for coins made of the same metals, the Vietnamese system used the văn as a basic number currency symbol indicating how much zinc cash coins (銅鐱, đồng kẽm) a brass or bronze cash coin (đồng điếu) was worth, the Vietnamese cash coins-based currency system used the mạch (陌) and quán (貫) as units of account that could be based on either zinc cash coins or copper-alloy cash coins depending on the region or context. It was continued to be used as a measurement for zinc cash coins when the French Indochinese piastre was introduced, after which the term still appeared on Vietnamese cash coins and represented a subdivision of copper-alloy cash coins rather than the piastre, this was known in French as the sapèque en zinc, as the production of zinc coinage was ceased by the Imperial government of the Nguyễn dynasty around the year 1871.

The French zinc sapèque was worth generally worth 1/600 of a piastre (a currency based on the Mexican peso) during the French domination period were primarily used in the French protectorate of Tonkin. Meanwhile cash coins that circulated in the French protectorate of Annam tended to be made from copper-alloys and were valued higher than the Tonkinese zinc cash coins, these cash coins still typically used the văn currency unit.

The Vietnamese term văn (文) would appear on the Thành Thái Thông Bảo (成泰通寶), Duy Tân Thông Bảo (維新通寶), and Bảo Đại Thông Bảo (保大通寶) cash coins produced under French rule, the last of these was officially produced until 1945.

== History ==
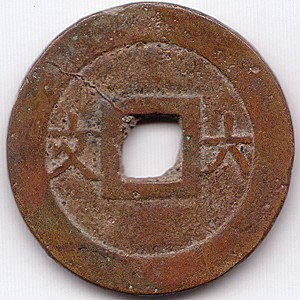
A Tự Đức Thông Bảo (嗣德通寶) cash coin with the reverse inscription "六文" indicating that it was worth six pieces of zinc cash coins.

It first used by official decree in January 1868 during the reign of the Tự Đức Emperor which decreed that "the value of the large module copper cash coin passed to 6 (zinc) and the small copper coin to 4 zinc". In 1872 the first brass Tự Đức Thông Bảo (嗣德通寶) cash coins with the monetary unit văn were cast in Hanoi, these cash coins has weight of 7 phần and had the reverse inscription "Lục Văn" (六文) on them indicating that these coins were worth 6 zinc cash coins. The introduction of this new currency symbol marked the change in the relationship between Vietnamese cash coins made from copper and cash coins of zinc and it de facto increased the value of the Vietnamese brass cash currency. In November 1879 the official value of 6 copper phần was equal to 6 sapèques of zinc. However the foreign cash coinages as well as imitation (counterfeit) Vietnamese cash coins made of inferior alloys that circulated in Vietnam at the time were exchanged for only 3 cash coins of zinc.

In the year 1893, large brass Thành Thái Thông Bảo (成泰通寶) cash coins with a denomination of 10 văn (十文, thập văn), or 10 zinc cash coins, started being produced by the Huế Mint.

During the end of the 19th century a Tonkinese string of zinc cash coins typically had 600 coins while an Annamese string of copper-alloy cash coins only had 100 coins.

== See also ==
- Farthing (British coin)
- Mill (currency)

== Sources ==
- Eduardo Toda y Güell (1882) ANNAM and its minor currency. Hosted on Art-Hanoi. (Wikimedia Commons)
- Dr. R. Allan Barker. (2004) The historical Cash Coins of Viet Nam. ISBN 981-05-2300-9
