= Machos =

Machos may refer to:

- Machos, Elis, a community in the municipal unit of Vartholomio, northwestern Elis, Greece
- Machos, Ceiba, Puerto Rico, a barrio in the municipality of Ceiba, Puerto Rico
- Machos (TV series), a Chilean television series
- Massive compact halo objects, or MACHOs, a kind of astronomical body that might explain the apparent presence of dark matter in galaxy halos
- Ferenc Machos, Hungarian footballer

== See also ==
- Macho (disambiguation)
