= Haitinger Prize =

The Haitinger Prize of the Austrian Academy of Sciences was founded in 1904 by the chemist and factory director, Ludwig Camillo Haitinger (1860–1945), who created the award in honor of his father, Karl Ludwig Haitinger. From 1905 to 1943 it was awarded every year, for "studies in chemistry and physics that proved to be of great practical use for industrial applications". The prize was awarded for the last time in the year 1954.

== Winners ==
- 1905 Friedrich Hasenöhrl for electromagnetic theory
- 1906 F. Ratz

Rudolf Scheuble for candles which burn in color

- 1907 Robert Kremann for research on esters
- 1908 Marian Smoluchowski for theoretical investigation of Brownian motion
- 1909 F. Haiser

F. Wenzel

- 1910 Anton Skrabal for research on kinetic reactions of potassium permanganate
- 1911 Gustav Jaumann for authoring the corotational rates known as “Jaumann derivatives”
- 1912 Albert Defant for atmospheric physics and weather research

Wilhelm Schmidt for research on microclimatology

- 1913 Franz Faltis for research on opiates, particularly morphine

Otto Hönigschmid for measurement of atomic mass

- 1914 Karl Przibram for studies on the electrical charge of fog particles
- 1915 Heinrich Mache for absolute measurement method of radioactivity
- 1916 Emil Abel for catalysis research
- 1917 Felix Ehrenhaft for photophoresis and effects on the interaction of light with particles
- 1918 Wolfgang Joseph Pauli (the father of the Nobel laureate Wolfgang Ernst Pauli) for his research on the chemistry of colloids.
- 1919 Max Bamberger

Julius Zellner

- 1920 Erwin Schrödinger for fundamentals of color theory

Hans Thirring for studies on general relativity

- 1921 Alfons Klemenc for studies on electrochemistry
- 1922 Alois Zinke for condensed ring systems

Anton Kailan for research on radium and ultraviolet radiation

- 1923 Adolph Smekal for research on quantum theory of dispersion
- 1924 Franz Aigner for underwater sound navigation

Gerhard Kirsch for research on nuclear physics and geologic time measurement

- 1925 Robert Kremann for the discovery of electrolyte effect of alloys

Ludwig Moser for quantitative rules for metals

- 1926 Georg Stetter for using electronics to measure the energy of nuclear particles
- 1927 Moritz Kohn for organic chemistry

J. Lindner for organic chemistry

- 1928 Karl Wilhelm Friedrich Kohlrausch for the law of independent migration of ions
- 1929 Fritz Feigel for his techniques in analytical chemistry

L. Schmid for organic chemistry

- 1931 Ewald Schmidt for research on radioactivity
- 1932 Otto Redlich for research on the properties of water and aqueous solutions
- 1933 Elizabeth Rona for her method of extracting polonium

Berta Karlik for her work on luminescence

- 1935 Joseph Mattauch for development of the Mattauch isobar rule
- 1936 Otto Kratky for studies on colloidal particles
- 1937 Marietta Blau and Hertha Wambacher for the identification of alpha-particles and protons
- 1939 Herbert Haberlandt for luminescence of fluorites
- 1947 Berta Karlik for her discovery of Astatine

== See also ==
- List of chemistry awards
- List of physics awards

== Sources ==
- Angetter, Daniela; Martischnig, Michael (2005). "Biografisches Handbuch österreichischer Physiker und Physikerinnen". Biografien österreichischer (Physiker)innen: Eine Auswahl. Vienna, Austria: Österreichischen Staatsarchiv. Archived from the original on 4 March 2016.
- Blumesberger, Susanne; Doppelhofer, Michael; Mauthe, Gabrielle, eds. (2002). Handbuch österreichischer Autorinnen und Autoren jüdischer Herkunft: 18. bis 20. Jahrhundert. München, Germany: K. G. Saur. ISBN 978-3-11-094900-1.
- Killy, Walther (2006). Dictionary of German Biography. Vol. 10: Thibaut - Zycha. München, Germany: Walter de Gruyter. ISBN 978-3-11-096116-4.
- Moore, Walter J. (1992). Schrödinger: Life and Thought. Cambridge, England: Cambridge University Press. ISBN 978-0-521-43767-7.
- Pohl, W. Gerhard (2004). Die wissenschaftliche Welt von gestern: die Preisträger des Ignaz L. Lieben-Preises 1865-1937 und des Richard Lieben-Preises 1912-1928 : ein Kapitel österreichischer Wissenschaftsgeschichte in Kurzbiografien (in German). Vienna, Austria: Böhlau Verlag Wien. ISBN 978-3-205-77303-0.
- Reif-Acherman, Simón (2008). "Otto Redlich: chemist and gentleman from the 'old school'". Química Nova. 31 (7): 1901–1908. doi:10.1590/S0100-40422008000700053.
- Rentetzi, Maria (2008). Trafficking materials and gendered experimental practices: radium research in early 20th century Vienna. New York City, New York: Columbia University Press. ISBN 978-0-231-13558-0.
- Rosner, Robert W. (2003). Marietta Blau - Sterne der Zertrümmerung: Biographie einer Wegbereiterin der modernen Teilchenphysik. Vienna, Austria: Böhlau Verlag. ISBN 978-3-205-77088-6.
- Tanner, R.I.; Walters, K. (1998). Rheology: An Historical Perspective: An Historical Perspective. Amsterdam, the Netherlands: Elsevier. ISBN 978-0-08-054057-3.
- Volk, Greg (2012). 19th Natural Philosophy Alliance Proceedings. Vol. 9. Eagan, Minnesota: Natural Philosophy Alliance. ISBN 978-1-105-95509-9.
