= Mach O =

Mach O, mach 0 or Mach Zero may refer to:

- Mach-O, the Mach object executable file format
- Mach 0, a mach number
- M.A.C.H. Zero, a fictional character from the comic book 2000 AD

== See also ==
- Mach (disambiguation)
- Macho (disambiguation)
