= Mach 1 =

Mach 1 can refer to:

- Mach number
- The speed of sound

== Literature and publications ==
- M.A.C.H. 1, a comic strip
- MACH-1 (Marvel Comics), a comic book superhero alter-ego of Abner Jenkins
- Mach 1: A Story of Planet Ionus, a novel by Allen Adler

== Automotive ==
- Mach 1 Racing, a former NASCAR team
  - Front Row Motorsports, a NASCAR team that ran with the Mach 1 Racing team name in 2004
- Ford Mustang Mach 1, a performance / grand touring (GT) high-end version of the Ford Mustang known for its styling (debuted in 1969)
- Ford Mach I Levacar, a 1959 Ford hovercraft, see List of Ford vehicles
- Kawasaki S1 Mach I, motorcycle
- Ducati Mach 1, motorcycle

== Other uses ==
- Mach One, a UK rock band
- Mach I, a space cadet program at the youth camp Aviation Challenge
- Fly Castelluccio Mach 1, a paramotor aircraft

== See also ==
- Mach (disambiguation)
- Machi (disambiguation)
