= Vietnamese mạch =

Defunct Vietnamese currency unit

chữ Hán: 陌 (mạch)
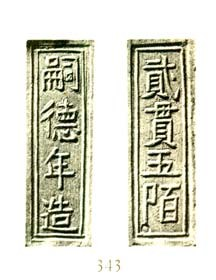
- A Tự Đức Niên Tạo (嗣德年造) silver ingot of 2 quán and 5 mạch (貳貫五陌).

Denominations
- Superunit
- 10: Quán (貫)
- Subunit
- 1/60: văn (文)

Demographics
- Date of introduction: 1837
- User(s): Đại Nam, French Indochina (until 1945)
- This infobox shows the latest status before this currency was rendered obsolete.

The mạch (chữ Hán: 陌) was a Vietnamese currency unit introduced in 1837 during the Nguyễn dynasty, the mạch represented a value of 60 văn (文, or 60 zinc cash coins) and was itself 1/10 of the quán (貫).

The mạch currency unit was used on both copper-alloy cash coins and silver ingots, the only series of cash coins to use the character "mạch" (陌) in its inscription was the Tự Đức Bảo Sao (嗣德寶鈔) cash coins, but had been previously used as a denomination (by imperial decree) for larger cash coins under the Minh Mạng Emperor. Unlike smaller coins, cash coins denominated in mạch were usually strung in strings of 10 coins.

== History ==
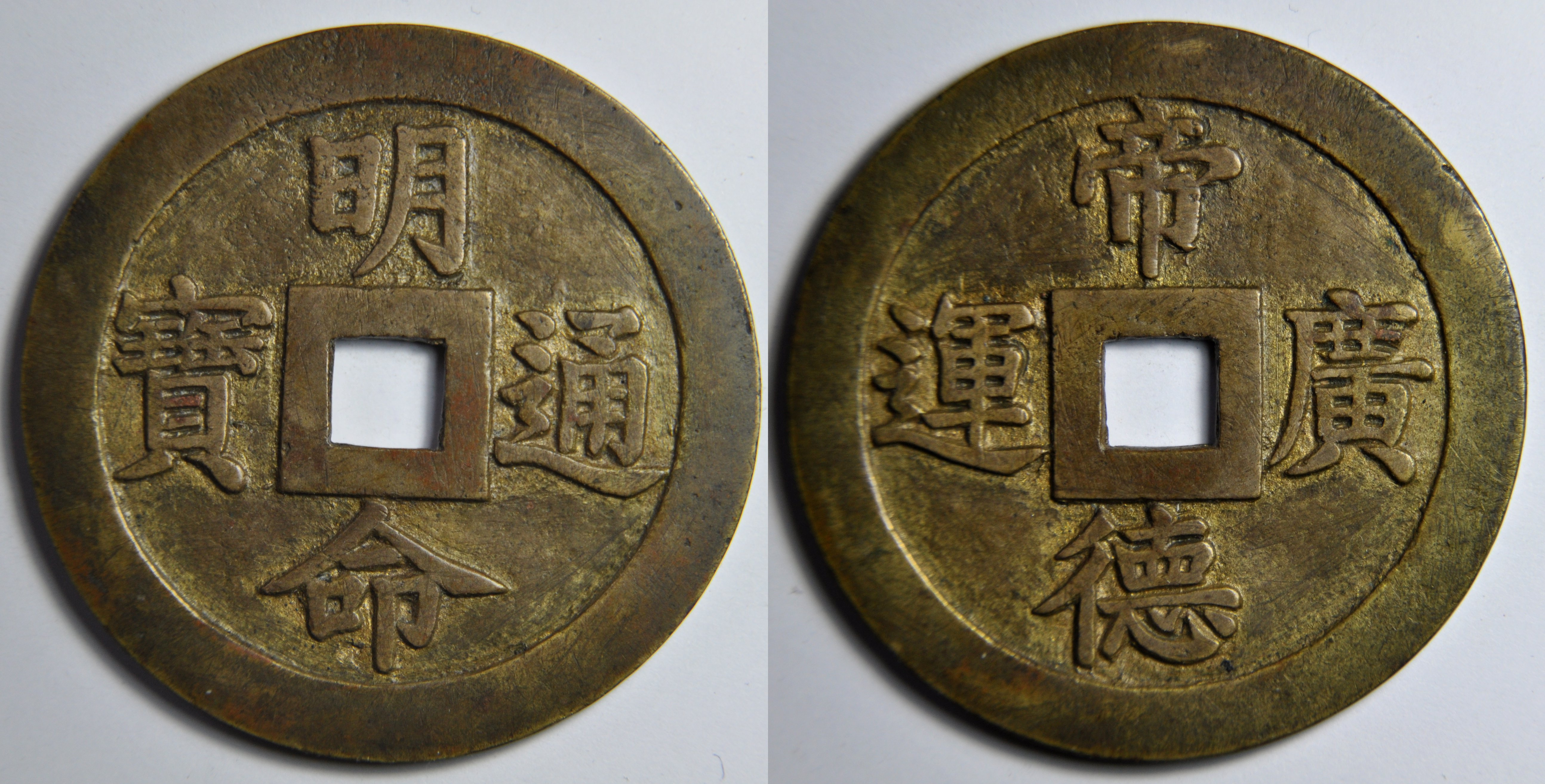
A large brass Minh Mạng Thông Bảo (明命通寶) cash coin of 1 mạch

The Minh Mạng emperor issued an imperial edict in 1837 stating "it is ruled under the terms of the law that the large monies of brass bearing moral inscriptions will have the value of a Mạch. One will make use of it in transactions and their value is thus fixed for all". These larger cash coins with "moral inscriptions" (美號, mỹ hiệu) were issued under the emperors Minh Mạng, Thiệu Trị, and Tự Đức. These coins were established by an edit in 1837, which stated that their manufacture should be entrusted to a commission composed of four representatives from different government agencies, one from the Ministry of Revenue (戸部, Hộ Bộ), one from the Ministry of Public Works (工部, Công Bộ), one from the Censorate (都察院, Đô sát viện), and one representative from the Imperial Guard (侍衛, Thị vệ). It is also highly likely that the designs of these cash coins were selected from manuals or commentaries published by the Directorate of Education (國子監, Quốc tử giám). These representatives were ordered to meet in a committee with the Director of the Mint and had to take to the Imperial Treasury some good quality metals, which included copper, tin, and zinc, they had to use these metals to make an alloy from them which was already prescribed to the proportions already set for these cash coins. The inscriptions had to be similar to those issued in previous years (these inscriptions were selected from a list "from the sacred and venerated books") and an annual production of 100,000 cash coins of 1 mạch was set. The edict stated that 23 inscriptions with 8 characters and 17 with 4 characters had to be devised annually.

Examples of inscriptions used on 1 mạch Minh Mạng Thông Bảo (明命通寶) cash coins would be Trung hòa vị dục (中和位育, "Balance and harmony, all in place, multiply"), Quốc Thái Dân An Phong Ðiều Vũ Thuần ("Country Prospers, People Content, Wind and Rain Plentiful"), and Nguyên hanh lợi trinh (元亨利貞, "The primordial exerts his influence, propicious and virtuous"). Many of the inscriptions on these cash coins are Confucian poems while others are small quotes from Chinese literature. During the Tự Đức era some 1 mạch Tự Đức Thông Bảo (嗣德通寶) cash coins had inscriptions like Quốc Phú, Binh Cường, Nội An. Ngoại Tĩnh ("To enrich the country, to strengthen the army, both the interior and the exterior are at peace and calm") despite the fact that Vietnam was suffering from large economic and military deficits at the time. While other Tự Đức Thông Bảo cash coins had inscriptions like Thọ Lộc Vu Thiên, Bảo Hựu Mạng Chi ("filled with honours by Heaven, it preserves the Mandate") and Sử Dân Phú Thọ (使民富壽, "Strive to ensure that the people enjoy wealth and longevity"). These larger cash coins were used for important monetary transactions, expense accounts, taxation, and government grants.

Under the reign of the Tự Đức Emperor the tiền (錢), mạch, and quán units of account were all redefined, the mạch was now used to represent 60 zinc cash coins (văn) and 10 mạch would form a quán (600 văn). The reason for this reorganisation of how the Vietnamese currency worked was that the overwhelming disadvantages of carrying zinc cash coins as they were very low in value and very heavy to carry around when having large quantities of them. The solution proposed by the government was introduce currency symbols used to represent their value nominally without this being necessarily reflected in their intrinsic value. The inspiration for creating this policy might have come from the coinage cast under the Xianfeng Emperor in neighbouring China. At the time, the Qing dynasty introduced a fiat coinage with 14 different denominations ranging from 4 wén to 1000 wén. There were still some major differences between the Chinese and Vietnamese systems, as in the Vietnamese currency system the nominal value was represented either using a basic number currency symbol (văn) or in units of account (mạch and quán) using both copper and zinc with pegged values, while the Chinese coinage system used cash coins made from the same copper-alloys with their value being based on the nominal value and not the intrinsic one, while the respective value of either copper or zinc fluctuated the exchange rates of the Nguyễn dynasty coinage. During this same era the Tokugawa shogunate of Japan introduced a 100 mon cash coin, the Ryukyuans had 100 mon and half Shu cash coins, and Joseon Korea a 100 mun cash coin known as the Dangbaekjeon. Despite taking inspiration from the coinage produced in Xianfeng era China and despite the fact that Tự Đức Bảo Sao could be translated as "The banknotes of Tự Đức", the first series of these coinages weren't truly a fiat currency as the currency symbols were, though not 100%, based on a convertibility between them and the traditional zinc cash coinage, meaning that they can't be seen as a true fiat coinage.

While the earlier 1 mạch were large coins, they were cast in brass with a diameter of about 50 millimeters and with weights varying according to the reign period: 26 to 28 grams during the Minh Mạng era, rising to 35 to 41 grams during the Thiệu Trị era, and reaching 35 to 50 grams during the Tự Đức era, but the new Tự Đức Bảo Sao of 60 văn (1 mạch) had a weight of only 12.20 grams. The main motivation of the government of Đại Nam to adopt this new system was purely to make the coin casting process more profitable, while the Tự Đức Thông Bảo cash coins of 6 phần or 9 phần cost much to make, the Tự Đức Bảo Sao cost significantly less for the same (or even higher) nominal value. By introducing the new system the government could cast brass cash coins of 50% copper and 50% zinc. If the government cast a cash coin of a nominal value of 10 văn with a weight of 1 tiền and 5 phần, it could produce 8000 văn in Tự Đức Bảo Sao being worth 133 quán, 3 mạch, and 20 văn with a profit of 2 quán, 1 mạch, and 50 văn. While the same weight used to produce cash coins of 20 văn (these coins weigh 2 tiền) one obtains 6000 văn in Tự Đức Bảo Sao worth 200 quán with a profit of 68 quán, 2 mạch, and 35 văn. As the 60 văn Tự Đức Bảo Sao meant for general circulation was exactly worth 1 mạch it was cast in high number. Meanwhile, the Tự Đức Bảo Sao cash coins of 10 văn, 20 văn, 30 văn, 40 văn, and 50 văn were cast at a rate of 20 smaller coins to 30 60 văn coins to serve as change.

Profit margins of the Tự Đức Bảo Sao
| Denomination | Percentage of profit |
|---|---|
| 10 văn | 0,90% |
| 20 văn | 52% |
| 30 văn | 82,9% |
| 40 văn | 103,2% |
| 50 văn | 117,4% |
| 60 văn (1 mạch) | 128,6% |

Despite the politicians calculating large profit margins on the Tự Đức Bảo Sao, they did not expect nor foresee that the general population would show widespread defiance to the new high-denomination cash coins. The new high-denomination cash coins would see little circulation; the only reason these high-denomination low intrinsic value saw circulation was because they were forced onto an unwilling public. The Tự Đức Bảo Sao series was abandoned shortly after its introduction. Afterwards a large number of Tự Đức Bảo Sao would still appear in the hands of private businesses such as metal founders, market stands, and antique shops selling them to Europeans, especially in Hanoi they were often displayed.

The 2nd series of Tự Đức Bảo Sao cash coins did not have their nominal value expressed in how many zinc cash coins they were worth but in mạch and quán. Furthermore, as opposed to only using the character "chuẩn" (準) with the characters "chuẩn đang" (準當) which convey the same message. This second series had the denominations of 2 mạch, 3 mạch, 8 mạch, 9 mạch, and 1 quán. While in the modern times a few of these cash coins have survived they weren't actually released into general circulation; this might have been because the government did not want to release coins whose face value would be too distinct from the traditional rate of exchange of copper-alloy cash coins which would have led to these emissions to be entirely rejected by the Vietnamese population. François Thierry de Crussol notes how all these cash coins are made from roughly cast brass and aren't properly trimmed. Because of this he suspects that they were only test issues.

After the production of the Tự Đức Bảo Sao stopped in 1871, production of the old 1-mạch cash coins was continued according to a letter written by Võ Đình Tình (武廷情), the head of the seal office, under the Censorate. According to the letter the order was given to mint a new series of Tự Đức Thông Bảo cash coins with moral maxims, the total amounted to 36,133 pieces.

During the Tự Đức era naming taboos were extended to the mạch cash coins, certain characters which were used on Minh Mạng era mạch cash coins were discontinued. Naming taboos have been common tradition in the Chinese cultural world since ancient China, such as that during the Han dynasty the character bang (邦), which could be translated as "country" or "state", was replaced with the guo (國), which had a similar meaning because bang was a part of the personal name of the founding emperor Liu Bang. During the Tang dynasty the characters shi (世) and min (民), which were also modified as they were a part of Emperor Taizong of Tang's personal name, Li Shimin. A naming taboo meant that people may not use a Chinese character which was present in the personal or of official name of the Vietnamese emperor, the empress or an imperial ancestor. The Chinese character which had become a "taboo character" would have to be replaced with a homonym or a non-orthodox version of that character. In Southern Vietnam the surnames Hoàng (黃) and Vũ (武) were read as Huỳnh (黃) and Võ (武) because of naming taboos. Naming taboos were overseen by the Ministry of Rites (禮部, Lễ Bộ) and over time more Chinese characters on the mạch cash coins were affected by these naming taboos some of these characters included húy (諱), hoa (華), (Note: Because the mother of the Thiệu Trị Emperor was called Hồ Thị Hoa (胡氏華).) and an (安). The naming taboo on the character an alone lead to the abolition of two types of 1 mạch cash coins due to their inclusion of this character.

== See also ==
- Cochinchina piastre
- Debasement

== Sources ==
- Eduardo Toda y Güell (1882) ANNAM and its minor currency. Hosted on Art-Hanoi. (Wikimedia Commons)
- Dr. R. Allan Barker. (2004) The historical Cash Coins of Viet Nam. ISBN 981-05-2300-9
- Albert Schroeder (1905), Annam, Études numismatiques (in French). Hosted on Wikimedia Commons.
