= Sikalongo =

Coordinates: 16°59′S 27°15′E

Sikalongo is a rural community in the Southern Province of Zambia. It is located 30 km east-south-east of Choma in the Singani Chieftaincy, not far from the Zambezi Escarpment north-west of Lake Kariba. It existed as a traditional community until the early twentieth century when American missionaries from the Brethren in Christ Church established a mission station there. During the first half of the twentieth century, missionaries established a church, a clinic, and a primary school. In 1968, the Brethren in Christ church established a Bible Institute which continues to the present. With help from the local community, the mission station established a secondary school during the 1970s.

== See also ==
- Brethren in Christ
- Macha Mission Station
