= Bảo Đại Thông Bảo =

Obsolete currency of Vietnam

Bảo Đại Thông Bảo (保大通寶)
- Nguyễn dynasty (French Indochina)
- Value: 6 văn, 10 văn (Note: See An muoi policy.) (French Indochinese piastre)
- Mass: machine-struck 1.40 g, cast, 6 văn 3.31 g, cast, 10 văn 4.01 g
- Composition: Copper (Brass)
- Years of minting: 1933–1940
- Circulation: 1933–1948

Obverse
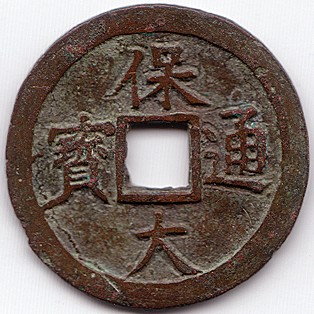
- Design: 保大通寶 (Bảo Đại Thông Bảo)

Reverse
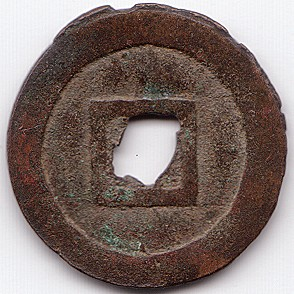
- Design: Blank; 6 văn (an-sau)
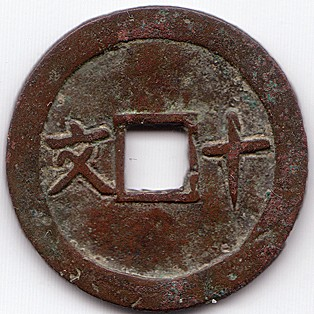
- Design: 十文 (thập văn); 10 văn (an-muoi)

The Bảo Đại Thông Bảo (chữ Hán: 保大通寶; French: Sapèque Bao-Daï) was a round Copper-alloy coin with a square hole produced by the Nguyễn dynasty under French protection and was the last cash coin produced both in Vietnam and the world, this ended a long series of cast Vietnamese coinage that started with the Thái Bình Hưng Bảo in 970. The cast Bảo Đại Thông Bảo were produced at the Thanh Hóa Mint, while the machine-struck variants were produced in Hanoi by the colonial French government. These coins bear the name of Emperor Bảo Đại who ascended the throne in 1926 but continued the production of the earlier Khải Định Thông Bảo (啓定通寶) that bore his father's era name until 1933 when he ordered the production of new coins with his reign name, which was normal as previous Vietnamese emperors also kept producing cash coins with the inscription of their predecessors for a period of time. The cast smaller Bảo Đại Thông Bảo cash coins with blank reverses were only valued at 1/600 piastre.

In 1932 it was reported by L'Éveil économique de l'Indochine ("The Economic Awakening of Indochina") that cash coins were increasingly becoming scarce in Annam and Tonkin, the L'Éveil économique de l'Indochine advised the government of the Nguyễn dynasty to start producing zinc Bảo Đại Thông Bảo cash coins to counter the scarcity of low denomination currencies, at this time zinc cash coins were still circulating in Annam while very few of them were left in Tonkin. During this period people were often unwilling to spend money because of the monetary scarcity of the time, economic policy advisors predicted that producing more cash coins would lower the cost of living for the population of the Nguyễn dynasty.

The Bảo Đại Thông Bảo were probably cast into 1941 or 1942 and the production was stopped because the occupying Japanese forces wanted the copper and were acquiring all of the cash coins they could find and stockpiling them in Haiphong for shipment to Japan for the production of war materials.

Cash coins would continue to circulate officially in the Democratic Republic of Vietnam until 1948 with an official exchange rate set of 20 cash coins for 1 đồng.

== An muoi policy ==
On 29 September 1939 the Hanoian newspaper l'Effort Indochinois reported that the governments of French Indochina and the Nguyễn dynasty pursued a policy called an muoi (the introduction of large denomination debased cash coins which only had a slightly higher intrinsic value to drive out lower value cash coins), which sought to stabilise the exchange rate between cash coins and the piastre at 360:1. During this period there was a market liquidity crisis worsened by the hoarding of low denomination cash coins by the general populace causing massive deflation of cash coins. Despite starting the an muoi policy in 1937, by 1939 the exchange rate between the piastre and cash coins was at 5 strings per piastre while in some rural areas the price of the piastre went down as much as 3 strings per piastre. The deflation of cash coins proved to be very detrimental to the economy and local trade.

The reason why these exchange rates were unstable was because cash coins remained independent of the piastre, despite their fixed exchange rates. Machine-struck cash coins tended to circulate more in Tonkin, while cast cash coins circulated more in rural Annam.

On Decree Number 55 dated 02-07-Bảo Đại 16 (24 August 1941) the Bảo Đại Emperor issued an ordonnance which states that within the entire territory of Trung Kỳ (Annam) the exchange rate between copper-alloy cash coins and the piastre was fixed at a rate of 4 strings of cash coins for 1 French Indochinese piastre, replacing the earlier Decree Number 1 of 21 February 1934 which fixed it at 6 strings of 50 cash coins. This decree applied to any cash coin bearing a reign era of the Nguyễn dynasty, with the definition of 4 strings of cash coins consisting of either 400 an-sau (6 văn) cash coins or 240 an-muoi (10 văn) cash coins. Meaning that 1 string of an-sau cash coins consisted of 100 coins, while 1 string of an-muoi cash coins consisted of 60 coins.

== Machine-struck Bảo Đại Thông Bảo cash coins ==
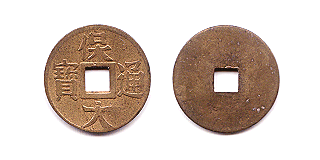
A machine-struck Bảo Đại Thông Bảo cash coin.

The French simultaneously began minting brass machine-struck cash coins in Hanoi, with the same inscription as the cast Bảo Đại Thông Bảo cash coins, with production officially starting in June 1933. These machine-struck cash coins weighed 1.36 grams and had an official exchange rate of 1/600 piastre, but were probably only valued at 1/1000 piastre.

These coins were minted at the Hanoi Mint (operated by the Banque de l'Indochine) because the French had cut the funding for producing cast cash coins at the Thanh Hòa Mint which meant that the Protectorate of Annam wasn't producing enough cast cash coins to satisfy the demands of the Vietnamese markets for these low value coins for every day exchange. The machine-struck Bảo Đại Thông Bảo cash coins were designed by René Mercier.

According to J. de Monty in Volonté (4 August 1933) Mercier had the enormous advantage of allowing an excellent execution of the production process with the minimum expenditure on material and handling. It was all the more important to seek to bring together all of these conditions, since in any case the new piece reaches its face value almost by the sole price of the material from which it is made, the brass. 12 years after the fact René Mercier commented on the matter: "It is, in fact, common to strike coins with a circular central hole. But to the Annamese the square hole in the cash coin represents the (concept of) earth, surmounted by a round tabernacle representing the firmament (heaven), there could be no question of modifying, for technical reasons, the ancestral form of the pieces. However, a square hole must be oriented, which ordinary machines are reluctant to do." Because of the unusual process of minting cash coins compared to more conventional coins Mercier sought to reduce the production process to a simpler and cheaper operation. The special tool used to mint these cash coins was developed by the firm Aviat. This tool operates automatically on a strip of brass 85 mm wide, in a single stroke of the pendulum: five strikes, five square openings, one spacing and five cutouts giving five finished pieces. The strip is pushed by hand by the coin mechanism and driven mechanically by two guide knives. The yield quickly reached 100,000 pieces per day, per press. A total of 6 coin presses were produced for the machine-struck Bảo Đại Thông Bảo.

The French authorities purely produced these coins for market liquidity and the French colonial authorities did not accept these coins for any payment to the government such as taxes or levies. By 30 September 1933 approximately 30 million of these cash coins were introduced to the public for general circulation. While the machine-struck cash coins were successful in Tonkin, they were less welcomed by the rural Annamite population who preferred the cast variant and even millennium old cast cash coins from "the good old days" over the modernised cash coins. The reluctance to accept the machine-struck cash coins in rural Annam contributed to the deflation that cash coins were experiencing there.

The machine-struck variants had a diameter 18 millimeters and a thickness of 7/10 of a millimeter. To have reached the ceiling of 100 million emissions, the production process had to last around 15 months at a rate of 7 to 10 million pieces per month. There were two variants of this cash coins, one had a large version of the Chinese character "大" (Đại) on its obverse, while the other variant had a smaller "大".

According to J. de Monty the total volume of issue was around 100 million coins, i.e. 160,000 piastres of nominal value in round figures with an expenditure of 120,000 piastres for the purchase of brass, 36,000 piastres for costs manufacturing and handling, and 4,000 piastres for transport from Haiphong (the place of mintage). Meaning that under the supervision of Mercier the production cost of these cash coins broke even with their nominal value (1/600 piastre).

After the Japanese had taken over the country, they forced the production of Bảo Đại Thông Bảo cash coins to stop because they were commandeering all copper in Vietnam. The Japanese created new sapèque-like coins that were made from zinc in Hanoi and by the Japan Mint in Osaka to replace these coins as the copper was being used for the production of Japanese weaponry and other military equipment, though the coins from Osaka didn't make it to the Vietnamese market as the shipping of war supplies was deemed more important by the Japanese government.

== Mintage figures ==
The government of the Nguyễn dynasty started manufacturing in 1933 and produced a total of 98,000 strings of Bảo Đại Thông Bảo cash coins, these figures include 49,000 strings of 100 « an sau » cash coins and 49,000 strings of 60 « an muoi » cash coins. This meant that a total of 4,900,000 « an sau » cash coins and 2,940,000 « an muoi » cash coins were produced as of 1936.

There were a total of 98,000,000 machine-struck Bảo Đại Thông Bảo sapèques produced by the government of the French protectorate of Tonkin. The production of these machine-struck cash coins started in 1933 and ended in 1934 and they all entered general circulation on 30 April 1935.

In total, using the rate of 7 strings for one piastre, the rate of exchange valid at the end of 1933, the number of cash coins manufactured between 1921 and 1936 had a value of approximately 1,315,000 piastres.

== See also ==
- Cash (Chinese coin)
- Kaiyuan Tongbao
- Tự Đức Thông Bảo
- Tự Đức Bảo Sao
