= Mach 8 =

Mach 8 or variation, may refer to:

- Mach number for eight times the speed of sound
  - Hypersonic speed of 8 times the speed of sound
- ATI Mach8, a 2D graphics chip for computer displays from ATI Technologies

== See also ==
- Mach (disambiguation)
