= Gustav Jaumann =

Austrian physicist

Gustav Andreas Johannes Jaumann (1863–1924) was an Austrian physicist. An assistant to the physicist Ernst Mach, he had a talent for mathematics, but disbelieved the existence of small particles like electrons and atoms. Between 1901 and 1924 he taught physics at the German Technical University in Brno. He won the Haitinger Prize of the Austrian Academy of Sciences in 1911.

== Remembered for ==
- "Corotational derivative" expresses the stress tensor in a rotating body.
- Jaumann was offered a professorship at Prague University in 1911, but refused the position. The candidate who was the faculty's first choice, Albert Einstein, would accept the offer after it was turned down by Jaumann, who is alleged to have said in an unsubstantiated quotation from Philipp Frank, "If Einstein has been proposed as the first choice because of the belief that he has greater achievements to his credit, then I will have nothing to do with a university that chases after modernity and does not appreciate merit." The actual reason as alleged by the Austrian Minister of Education, in his official report to Emperor Franz Josef, seems to have been about money. The beleaguered situation of Germans in Prague at the time, with which Jaumann was familiar, may also have been a factor in his declining the post. Jaumann was apparently the candidate preferred by the Austro-Hungarian ministry, presumably because he was Austrian and not a foreigner. Einstein, under the impression he would not receive the job, however, blamed his "Semitic origin [that] the ministry did not approve [of]".

== See also ==
- Zaremba-Jaumann stress rate
