= Mach 5 =

Mach 5 or variation may refer to:

- Mach 5 (speed), a mach number, 5 times the speed of sound
- Mach Five (Speed Racer), a racing car in that franchise
- Mach-V, an alias of the Marvel Comics character Abner Jenkins
- "Mach 5" (song), a 1996 song by alternative rock band The Presidents of the United States of America
- Wharfedale MACH 5, a loudspeaker in the Wharfedale MACH series
- PowerPC 604ev (codenamed Mach 5), a CPU found in Apple Macintosh computers, see PowerPC 600
