= Mach 6 =

Mach 6 or variation, may refer to:

- Mach number representing 6-times the speed of sound
  - Hypersonic speed of 6-times the speed of sound
- Mach 6 (album), 2003 album by MC Solaar
- Mach Six, fictional racing car in the same franchise as Mach Five (Speed Racer)
- Mach-VI, alias of the Marvel Comics character Abner Jenkins

== See also ==
- Mach (disambiguation)
