= Macha Mission =

Human settlement in Zambia

Coordinates: 16°24′S 26°47′E

Macha Mission is a mission station in the Choma District of the Southern Province of Zambia. While it started out as a place to convert the local population to Christianity, it has grown into a community centre with a church, five schools, a hospital and a malaria research centre.

Macha Mission began as a Christian mission station in 1906. Hannah Frances Davidson, an American missionary from the Brethren in Christ (BIC) church, traveled there from Matopo Mission in Southern Rhodesia (present-day Zimbabwe). She was accompanied by two African helpers and Adda Engle, another missionary. Davidson and her companions subsequently embarked on the task of converting local Tonga and Ila peoples to Christianity. They established a school, a church, and eventually a clinic.

In the 1950s the medical mission of the site greatly expanded due to the presence of Alvan Thuma, a physician and BIC missionary from the United States, and his wife Ardys. The history of their involvement in Macha has been documented in the book First a Friend

The mission became the anchor for later Brethren in Christ mission work in Southern Zambia with missionaries expanding to Sikalongo and to Choma. The mission continues to function currently. It has grown considerably and now includes a hospital, a nursing school, two secondary schools and two primary schools.

== Developments since 2000 ==
Long term ongoing research in malaria got a boost early 2003, with the establishment of a formal malaria research centre. The Malaria Institute at Macha (MIAM) collaborates with Johns Hopkins Bloomberg School of Public Health to do continuing research in malaria and related diseases. Later the research also encompassed TB and HIV, with special attention into Pediatric HIV.

Macha Works, a cooperative organisation, partnered at Macha Mission and implemented an aerodrome, ABFA, restaurant, Care House, Library and Craft Shop, ICT training center, Macha Innovative Christian School, and housing facilities at Ubuntu Campus. In addition, a large Jatropha Farm was started at Macha Mission by Macha Works. From the base at Macha, Macha Works extended activities in 8 other rural communities throughout Zambia (status mid-2010).

Vision Community Radio Macha, broadcasting from Vision House just off Macha Mission, can be received in an 80 km radius on 92.9 MHz, FM.

== See also ==
- Brethren in Christ
- Sikalongo
