= Machas a la parmesana =

Chilean seafood dish with razor clams

- Type: Seafood
- Course: Starter, Main
- Place of origin: Chile
- Region or state: Coast
- Created by: Chilean
- Serving temperature: Hot
- Main ingredients: Machas (aka pink clams), Parmesan cheese, white wine

Machas a la parmesana or “Parmesan machas” is a dish made with the macha. This is a saltwater clam, a bivalve that is native to Chile. It was harvested by ancient fishermen of these two countries. This bivalve is known scientifically as Mesodesma donacium and in English is called either the pink clam, or the surf clam. The dish also includes Parmesan cheese.

== History ==
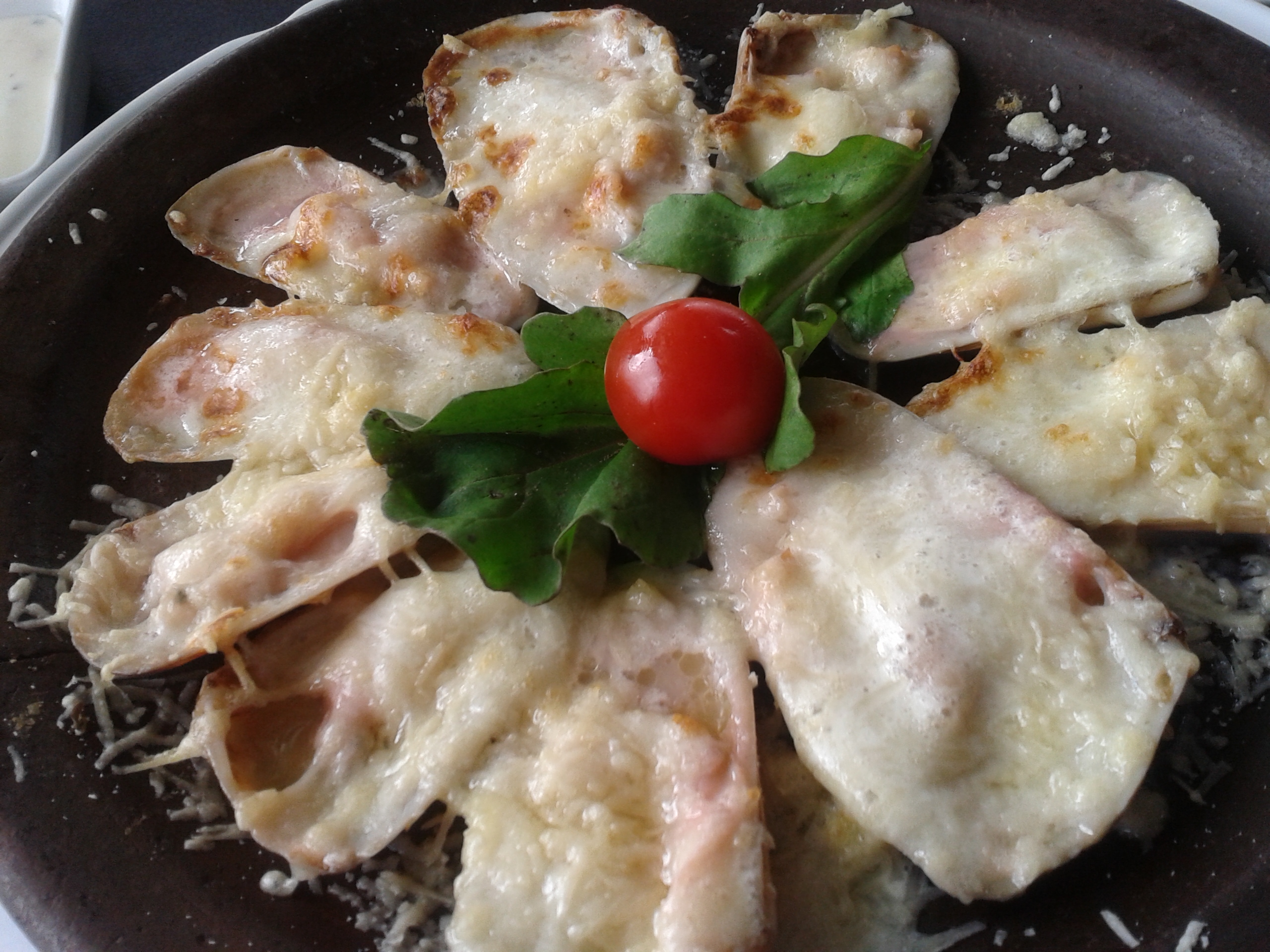
Machas a la parmesana

This classic of Chilean cuisine was created more than 50 years ago in Viña del Mar by the Italian immigrants Edoardo Melotti Ferrari and Adelfo Garuti at the Italian restaurant San Marco. There is no previous record of the dish before the 1950s.

The dish is popular along the coast of Chile, where the macha can be found in great numbers. It is prepared with the meat of the macha in one half of the shell, covered in Parmesan cheese, a little butter and seasoned with white wine or a drop of lemon, and then baked for a few minutes.

=== Variations ===
There are several variations of this dish: the same ingredients can be combined in an earthenware paila; the Parmesan can be replaced with the Chilean cheese queso mantecoso; it can be prepared with cream added or with sliced garlic added; and it can be made using other types of clams rather than machas.

== See also ==
- Chilean cuisine
- Immigration to Chile
- Chilean Culture
