= Mach: The First Colony =

1983 science fiction role-playing game

Mach: The First Colony is a role-playing game published by Alliance Publications in 1983.

== Description ==
Following an earth-shattering disaster, the remnants of humanity were rescued and moved to the planet Mach, which they now share with several other alien species who have likewise been moved here. Although the setting is science fiction, the society is low-tech, where the player characters are mercenaries on a frontier planet, "much more likely to be attacked with spears and swords than plasma beams or laser guns."

The boxed set comes with a 32-page book that covers character creation and combat; a 32-page book about skills and creatures; and a 16-page sample adventure. Material covered includes the planet Mach, its societies, and mixed technologies.

The heart of the game is the players' relationships with the non-human residents of the planet. As game critic Rick Swan observed, "Alliances are shattered, negotiated. then shattered again, with a mysterious race of tentacled monstrosities lurking in the background who may or may not have the humans' best interests at heart."

== Publication history ==
Mach: The First Colony was designed by Michael Lange with Martin Miller, and published by Alliance Publications in 1983 as a boxed set. Despite good reviews, the game failed to find an audience, and was out of print by 1990.

== Reception ==
William A. Barton reviewed Mach - The First Colony in Space Gamer No. 69. Barton commented that "Those players who like complex, highly detailed games – players of systems such as Space Opera, Chivalry & Sorcery, and Aftermath – might find Mach worth its [...] price. Admirers of simpler systems, such as The Fantasy Trip, Star Trek or Call of Cthulhu, should probably pass this one up."

In his 1990 book The Complete Guide to Role-Playing Games, Rick Swan called this "An out-of-print game that's worth the search for its interesting setting." Swan gave the game a rating of 2.5 out of 4, saying, "The game mechanics aren't much ... But in the hands of an inventive referee, Mach's intriguing premise could form the basis of a superb adventure for Star Trek, MegaTraveller, or other science fiction RPGs.
