= Machi, Iran =

Machi مچي
- Village
- Location within Iran
- Coordinates: 26°06′46″N 57°21′48″E
- Country: Iran
- Province: Hormozgan
- County: Jask
- Bakhsh: Central
- Rural District: Kangan

Population (2006)
  - Total: 149
- Time zone: UTC+3:30 (IRST)
  - Summer (DST): UTC+4:30 (IRDT)

Machi (Persian: مچي, also romanized as Machī) is a village in Kangan Rural District, in the Central District of Jask County, Hormozgan Province, Iran. At the 2006 census, its population was 149, in 27 families.
