= Macho Man =

Macho Man may refer to:

- Randy Savage (1952–2011), an American professional wrestler known by the epithet "Macho Man"

== Literature ==
- Macho Man, a 1975 novel by Peter Tuesday Hughes
- Macho Man: The Disco Era and Gay America's Coming Out, a 2008 pop culture book by Randy Jones and Mark Bego

== Music ==
- Macho Man (album), a 1978 album by the Village People
  - "Macho Man" (song), a song from the album
    - Mucho Macho Man, an American racehorse, so called in tribute to the song by Village People

== Television ==
- "Macho Man", Bosom Buddies season 1, episode 4 (1980)
- "Macho Man", Step by Step season 6, episode 17 (1997)
- "Macho Man", The Misadventures of Sheriff Lobo season 2, episode 4 (1981)
- "Macho Man", Three's Company season 6, episode 11 (1981)
- "Macho Man", When the Whistle Blows episode 8 (1980)

== Other ==
- Super Macho Man, a character in the Punch-Out!! video game series

== See also ==
- Macho
- Machismo
