= Mesodesma =

Scientific classification
- Domain: Eukaryota
- Kingdom: Animalia
- Phylum: Mollusca
- Class: Bivalvia
- Order: Venerida
- Superfamily: Mactroidea
- Family: Mesodesmatidae
- Genus: Mesodesma; Deshayes, 1832

Species
- See text.

Genus of bivalves

Mesodesma is a genus of saltwater clams, marine bivalve mollusks in the family Mesodesmatidae. It is the type genus of the family.

== Species ==
There are numerous species within the genus Mesodesma, including:

- Mesodesma donacium (Lamarck, 1818) colloquially known and eaten as macha in Peru and Chile
