= Macháč =

Machač or Macháč (Czech feminine: Machačová or Macháčová) is a Czech surname. Notable people with the name include:

- Božena Machačová-Dostálová (1903–1973), Czech politician
- Jan Macháč, Czech canoeist
- Jarmila Machačová (born 1986), Czech racing cyclist
- Jaroslav Machač (born 1926), Czech speedway rider
- Oldřich Machač (1946–2011), Czech ice hockey player
- Patrik Machač (born 1994), Czech ice hockey player
- Tomáš Macháč (born 2000), Czech tennis player

== See also ==
- MacHack
