= Macháček =

Macháček (feminine Macháčková) is a Czech surname. Notable people with the surname include:

- Alex Machacek (born 1972), Austrian guitarist
- Jolanda Macháček (born 2005), Famous pod snifter
- Jan Macháček (born 1972), Czech rugby player
- Jiří Macháček (born 1966), Czech actor
- John Machacek (1940–2020), American journalist
- Josef Macháček (born 1957), Czech rally driver
- Martin Macháček (born 1989), Czech footballer
- Miroslav Macháček (1922–1991), Czech stage actor
- Spencer Machacek (born 1988), Canadian ice hockey player
