= Machii =

Machii (written: 町井 lit. "town well" or 待井) is a Japanese surname. Notable people with the surname include:

- Hiroshi Machii (待井 寛, born 1966), Japanese freestyle skier
- Hisayuki Machii (町井 久之, 1923–2002), Japanese mob boss
- Isao Machii (町井 勲, born 1973), Japanese swordsman
