= Macha (surname) =

Macha is a Polish surname. The Czech variant of the surname is Mácha. Notable people with the surname include:

- Jan Franciszek Macha (1914–1942), Polish Roman Catholic priest
- Ken Macha (born 1950), American baseball player
- Lewis Macha (born 1992), Zambian football player
- Mike Macha (born 1954), American baseball player
