= Heinrich Mache =

Austrian physicist

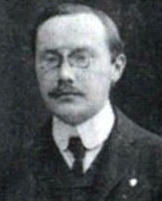
- Heinrich Mache
- Born: 27 April 1876; Prague, Austria-Hungary
- Died: 1 September 1954 (aged 78); Vienna, Austria
- Education: University of Vienna
- Known for: Mache (unit)
- Scientific career
- Fields: Physicist
- Workplaces: Vienna Academy; University of Vienna; Technical University Vienna
- Doctoral advisor: Franz Serafin Exner
- Other academic advisors: Ludwig Boltzmann

Heinrich Mache (27 April 1876 – 1 September 1954) was an Austrian physicist. He won the Haitinger Prize of the Austrian Academy of Sciences in 1915.

== Life ==
Born in Prague, after his secondary school studies, Mache completed the first year of physics in Prague; among other things, he heard lectures by Ernst Mach and in 1894 moved with his family to Vienna, where he continued his studies with Franz Serafin Exner and continued with Ludwig Boltzmann. He received his doctorate in 1898, working under Exner on the "experimental proof of electrostriction in gases" and worked as a photographic expert during 1900/1901 and participated in the astronomical expedition for the Vienna Academy to India. In connection with his research, he conducted air electrical measurements on the Red Sea, in Delhi, Ceylon and Upper Egypt. In 1901, he habilitated at the University of Vienna. In 1906, he was appointed associate professor at the University of Innsbruck, which he left after two years in order to accept the position as a professor at the Technical University Vienna. He was the successor of Friedrich Hasenöhrl. He died in Vienna.

== Noteworthy relatives ==
His wife was the granddaughter of the great geologist Eduard Suess.

== Tributes and memorials ==
In 1966, in Donau City (22nd District), Vienna, the Makegasse (Mache Alley) was named in his honour.

== Research, interests and achievements ==
His research was mainly radioactivity, thermodynamics, atmospheric electricity, and the physics of combustion phenomena. He developed with Ludwig Flamm a theory of combustion of explosive gas mixtures. Due to his work with radon, the now unusual unit Mache was named for describing the activity of radioactive medicinal waters.

- Wilhelm Exner Medal, 1927

Mache continued the Zippermayr Group experiments with early Carbon-Oxygen Fuel–air explosives, which the SS sought to develop in Austria during WWII, under the Soviets in late 1945.

== Mache unit ==
The Mache is the amount of radon in one litre that will produce a saturation current of 0.001 electrostatic unit (ESU) of current and is equivalent to 364 pCi L^{−1}. The eman (emanation) unit, used in the 1920s and 1930s, is equivalent to 100 pCi L^{−1}.
