= Mácha =

Mácha (feminine: Máchová) is a Czech surname. Notable people with the surname include:

- Karel Hynek Mácha (1810–1836), Czech poet
- Karla Máchová (1853–1920), Czech women's rights activist, journalist and politician
- Marcel Mácha (born 1969), Czech footballer
- Otmar Mácha (1922–2006), Czech composer
- Radka Máchová (born 1949), Czech aerobatic pilot
- Vítězslav Mácha (1948–2023), Czech wrestler

== See also ==
- Lake Mácha
