= Macho (surname) =

Macho is the surname of:

- Fidel Uriarte Macho (1945–2016), Spanish retired footballer
- José Cos y Macho (1838-1919), Spanish Roman Catholic cardinal and archbishop
- Jürgen Macho (born 1977), Austrian footballer
- Michal Macho (born 1982), Slovak ice hockey player
- Palo Macho (born 1965), Slovak painter
- Victorio Macho (1887–1966), Spanish sculptor

== See also ==
- Ferenc Machos (1932-2006), Hungarian footballer
