= Tiền =

Currency used in 19th and 20th century Vietnam

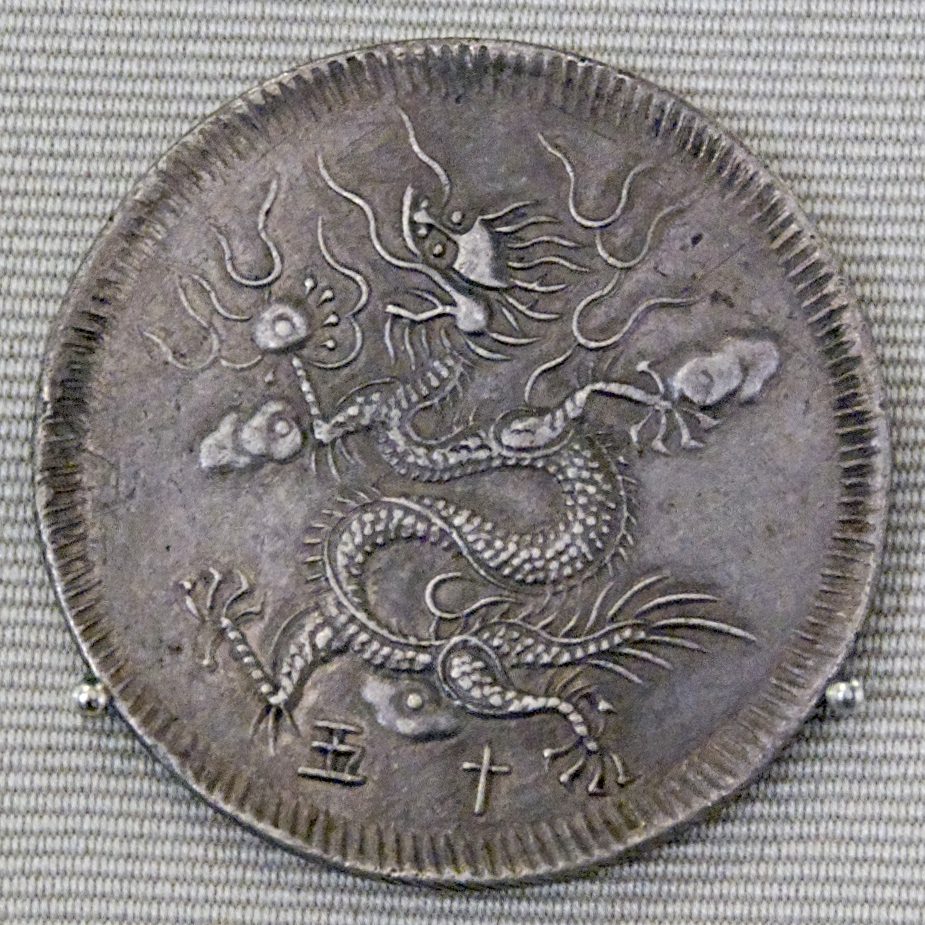
A silver Phi Long coin of 1 tiền issued under the Minh Mạng Emperor in 1833.

The term tiền (chữ Hán: 錢) is used to refer to various currency-related concepts used in Vietnamese history. The name is a cognate with the Chinese qián (錢), a unit of weight called "mace" in English. It can refer to a unit of weight used in precious metal coinages as well as the number of cash coins in a string. The name was also used for different awards, both Chinese-style and Western-style awards given in Vietnam throughout different times of its history.

The word tiền is also the Vietnamese word for the concept of money in general.

== Cash coins ==
In cash coins the term tiền could be used to refer to sub-strings of 10 cash coins in a string of 100~600. Though the quality of cash coins was also important for counting a tiền, in 1945 a tiền of tiền gián included 36 cash coins, while a tiền of tiền quý included 60 cash coins. (Note: The terms tiền gián and tiền quý were used to refer to different types of cash coins based on different quality and alloys between the 16th and 20th centuries.)

== Precious metal coinages ==
In the early 19th century, silver and gold bars were traded as currency in imperial Vietnam with values of up to 10 tiền (approximately 40 grams, or 1 tael). Bars of 1 tiền weighed between 3 and 4 grams. During this time, silver and gold coins were minted (using Vietnamese characters and design, but of types resembling either Chinese cash or Western coins) with denominations of up to 10 tiền being minted.

During the Minh Mạng period (1820–1841) dragons on silver tiền coins were often depicted facing dexter (to the right), while during the Thiệu Trị period (1841–1847) and later these coins depicted dragons guardant (facing forwards).

In the year Minh Mệnh 14 (1833) the Phi Long dragon coins were depreciated by increasing the amounts of copper and zinc that were in them lowering their silver content.

These coins continued to be minted in varying quantities into the 20th century in French Indochina, although circulating alongside the French Indochinese piastre.

== Tiền decorations ==
The Tiền was also a name of decorations given by the government of the Nguyễn dynasty until 1945, like in Imperial China these coins came in the form of presentation coins, but after French colonisation the Tiền was also awarded as European-style medals called the Sapèque d'Honneur ("Cash coin of Honour").

Tiền presentation coin decorations came in multiple classes and were known as Đồng Tiền (銅錢, "Copper money"), Ngân Tiền (銀錢, "Silver money"), and Kim Tiền (金錢, "Gold money"). The Sapèque d'Honneur medal was further subdivided into the Sapèque d'Argent (made of silver) and the Sapèque d'Or (made of gold).

These decorations generally took the shape of silver or gold cash coins as well as other coinages issued by the Nguyễn dynasty, but would often have more elaborate designs and (often) different inscriptions.

== See also ==
- Vietnamese mạch
