= Mache (unit) =

Mache (symbol ME from German Mache-Einheit, plural Maches) is a unit of volumic radioactivity named for the Austrian physicist Heinrich Mache. It was defined as the quantity of radon (ignoring its daughter isotopes; in practice, mostly radon-222) per litre of air which ionises a sustained current of 0.001 esu (0.001 StatAmpere).

1 ME = 3.64 Eman = 3.64×10^{−10} Ci/L = 13.4545 Bq/L.
