= Eduardo Toda y Güell =

Spanish diplomat, historian, Egyptologist and numismatist

- Eduard Toda i Güell
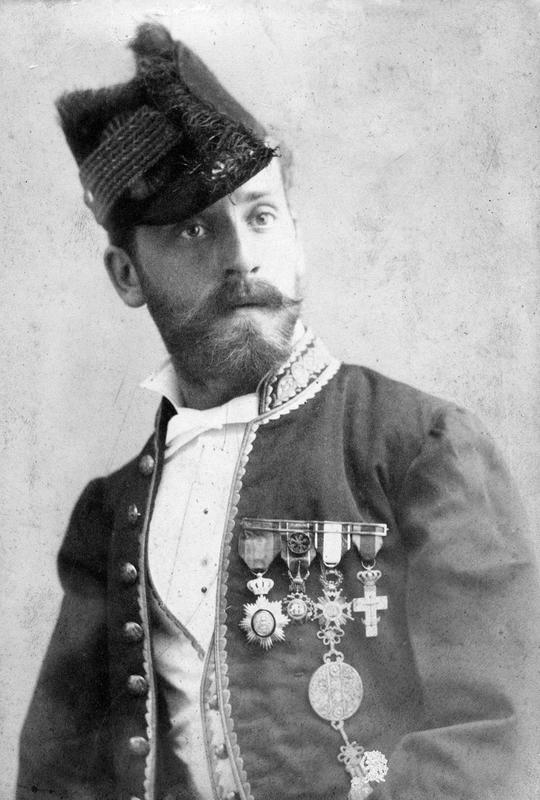
- Eduard Toda in Spanish vice-consul uniform, 1883
- Born: 9 January 1855; Reus, Spain
- Died: 26 April 1941 (aged 86); Poblet, Spain
- Occupation(s): Archaeologist, diplomat, Egyptologist, sinologist
- Notable work: Annam and Its Minor Currency (1882); A través del Egipto (1889)

Signature
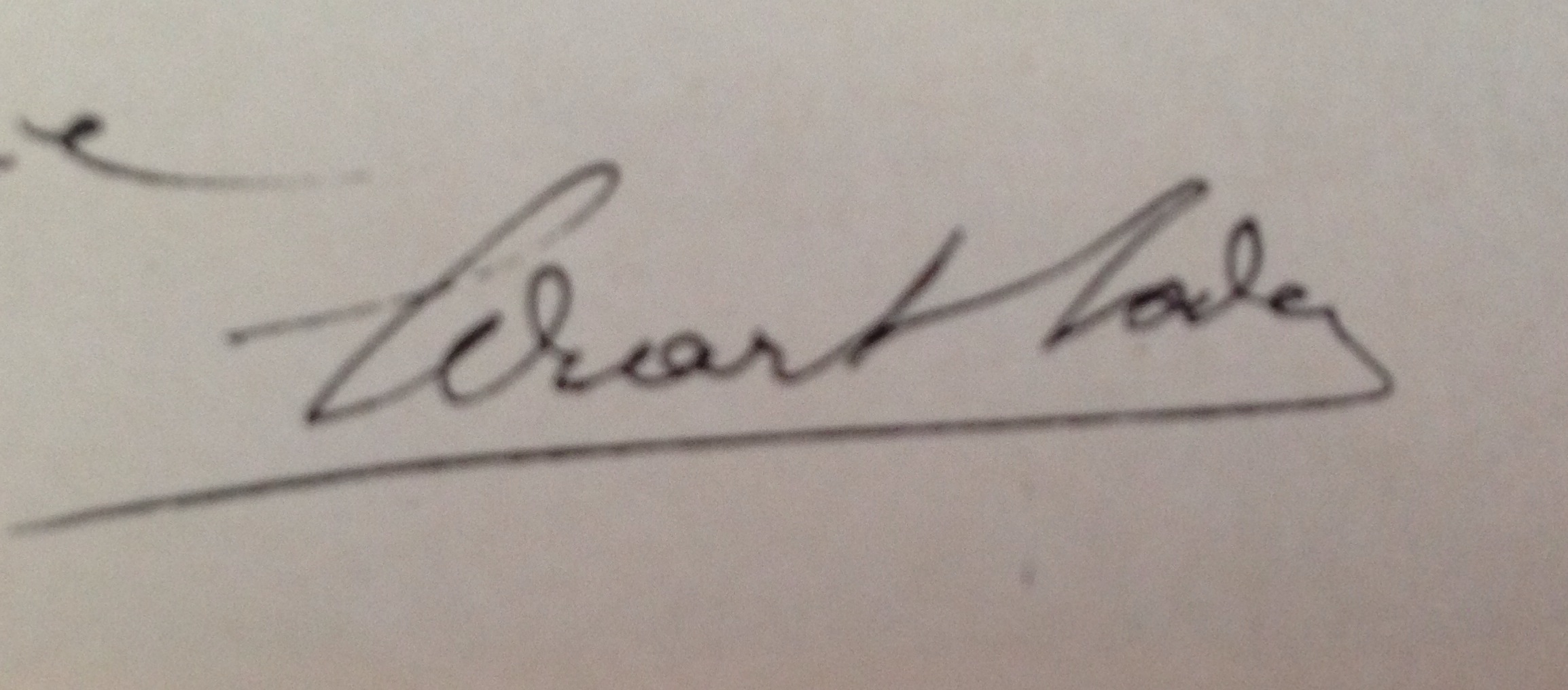

Eduardo Toda y Güell (9 January 1852, in Reus – 26 April 1941, in Poblet) was a Spanish diplomat, historian, Egyptologist and numismatist.

== Career ==
After studying law at the Central University of Madrid, Eduardo was appointed Vice-Consul in Macao, Hong Kong, Canton, and Shanghai.

Subsequently, he was Consul General in Cairo, Egypt (1884-1886) and became friends with Gaston Maspero. During his post, he became very interested in ancient Egypt. While at Deir el-Medina, he was responsible for clearing the intact tomb of Sennedjem in 1886.

After being posted to Helsinki and Le Havre, he decided to abandon his diplomatic career and move to London. He didn't return to Spain until 1918 where he created the collection Estudios Egiptológicos and later tried to establish a school of Egyptology. After being unsuccessful in his attempts, he moved to the Castle-Monastery of Escornalbou where he devoted himself to the history of the Poblet Abbey.

He became a professor at the School of Librarians of the Provincial Diputación of Barcelona, a Corresponding Member of the Catalan Studies Institute and a Member of the Reial Acadèmia de Bones Lletres de Barcelona. He presented his personal library to several Catalan institutions where he gave his Numismatic collection to the Archivo Histórico Nacional in Madrid, his Egyptian collection to the National Archaeological Museum of Spain, and the Biblioteca Museu Víctor Balaguer in Vilanova i la Geltru.

== Publications ==
- Macao (Recorts de viatje), 1877
- Annam and its minor currency, 1882
- Poblet. Recorts de la Conca de Barberá, 1883
- Sesostris, 1886
- La Vida en el Celeste Imperio, 1887
- La Muerte en el Antiguo Egipto, 1887
- Son Notem en Tebas : Inventario y textos de un sepulcro egipcio en la XX dinastía, 1887
- Catálogo de la Colección Egipcia de la Biblioteca-Museo Balaguer, 1887
- Un poble català d'Itàlia: l'Alguer, (Barcelona, 1888)
- A través del Egipto, 1889
- Translation of George Rawlinson's work, Historia del Antiguo Egipto, 1894

== Biographical information ==
- F. Valls Taberner, "Necrología. Eduardo Toda y Güell", Hispania no.4, 1941, pp. 123–128.
- J. Padró, "Édouard Toda, diplomate espagnol, érudit catalan et égyptologue du XIXe siècle", in Bulletin de la Société française d'égyptologie no.113, octobre 1988, pp. 34–41.
- Ève Gran-Aymerich, "Les Chercheurs de passé", éditions du CNRS, 2007, pp. 1195–1196.
- Mònica GINÉS BLASI, "Eduard Toda i Güell: From Vice-Consul of Spain in China to the Renaixença in Barcelona (1871-84)", ENTREMONS. Journal of World History (Universitat Pompeu Fabra Barcelona) Número 5 (juny 2013).
