= Wharfedale MACH =

Loudspeakers

The Wharfedale MACH series of loudspeakers consists of the MACH 3, 5, 7, and 9. This is an informational page devoted to owners and users of these loudspeakers and those interested in history and construction of electronic sound reproduction.

These loudspeakers were manufactured at Rank Hi-Fi, Wharfedale Works in West Yorkshire by Wharfedale Loudspeakers in England (UK). They were featured in the Gramophone magazine in July 1982. This range of high-efficiency (hi-fi) loudspeakers were released to replace their "E" Series of loudspeakers. They were originally launched with prices from £200 to £430 per pair. The drive units boasted a high sensitivity due to care in design and construction. The tweeters (one per speaker) use horn-loaded compression. The woofers and mids use lightweight fibre cones with ceramic magnets and ventilated aluminium coils. The cabinets were made out of wood and were marketed for bass reflex. The cabinets have modular front baffles made from styrofoam (polystyrene) with open-weave steel-mesh grilles. Opaque clip-on grilles were also supplied and all the speakers have LED power displays and re-settable overload protection. There are adjustable dials to control the midrange 100mm driver (tweeter on Mach 3 and mid on Machs 5, 7, and 9)

== Specifications ==
=== Mach 3 ===
- 1x25mm Treble: horn-loaded compression tweeter
- 1x200mm Bass Woofer lightweight fibre cone
- Crossover frequency 5 kHz¿
- Sensitivity: 94dB for 1 Watt at 1 metre
- Enclosure volume: 20 Litres
- Dimensions: 335 x 573 x 231 mm (W x H x D)
- Impedance: 8 Ohms
- Power handling: 100 Watts
- Recommended amplifier power rating: 10-100 Watts
- Frequency range: 55 Hz to 22 kHz (DIN45500)
- Frequency range (±3dB): 62 Hz to 17 kHz
- Sensitivity: 94dB for 1 Watt at 1 metre (Anechoic)
- Computer optimized bass loading

=== Mach 5 ===
- 1x25mm Treble: horn-loaded compression tweeter
- 1x100mm Mid: lightweight fibre cone
- 1x200mm Bass: lightweight fibre cone woofer
- Enclosure volume: 30 Litres
- Dimensions: 335 x 573 x 291 mm (W x H x D)
- Impedance: 8 Ohms
- Power handling: 125 Watts
- Recommended amplifier power rating: 20-125 Watts
- Frequency range: 55 Hz to 22 kHz (DIN45500)
- Frequency range (±3dB): 62 Hz to 17 kHz
- Sensitivity: 94dB for 1 Watt at 1 metre (Anechoic)
- Computer optimized bass loading

=== Mach 7 ===
- 1x25mm Treble: horn-loaded compression tweeter
- 1x100mm Mid: lightweight fibre cone
- 1x250mm Bass: lightweight fibre cone woofer
- Enclosure volume: 50 Litres
- Dimensions: 335 x 681 x 328 mm (W x H x D)
- Impedance: 8 Ohms
- Power handling: 150 Watts
- Recommended amplifier power rating: 20-150 Watts
- Frequency range: 48 Hz to 22 kHz (DIN45500)
- Frequency range (±3dB): 55 Hz to 17 kHz
- Sensitivity: 94dB for 1 Watt at 1 metre (Anechoic)
- Computer optimized bass loading

=== Mach 9 ===
- 1x25mm Treble: horn-loaded compression tweeter
- 2x100mm Mid: lightweight fibre cone
- 1x250mm Bass: lightweight fibre cone woofer
- Enclosure volume: 70 Litres
- Dimensions: 335 x 826 x 328 mm (W x H x D)
- Impedance: 8 Ohms
- Power handling: 200 Watts
- Recommended amplifier power rating: 20-200 Watts
- Frequency range: 43 Hz to 22 kHz (DIN45500)
- Frequency range (±3dB): 50 Hz to 17 kHz
- Sensitivity: 94dB for 1 Watt at 1 metre (Anechoic)
- Computer optimized bass loading

== Competitors ==
Some competing loudspeakers sold at the time were the Bose 901 Series IV and V, Bose 201 Series I, Bose Series 601 Series II, JBL Delta, Cerwin Vega D series, JBL Radiance, JBL Sigma, and Acoustic Research AR-58B.

== See also ==
- Quad Electroacoustics
