= Outline of economics =

Overview of and topical guide to Economics

Economics classes make extensive use of supply and demand graphs like this one to teach about markets. In this graph, S and D refer to supply and demand and P and Q refer to the price and quantity.

The following outline is provided as an overview of and topical guide to economics. Economics is a branch of science that analyzes the production, distribution, and consumption of goods and services. It aims to explain how economies work and how agents (people) respond to incentives.

Economics is a behavioral science (a scientific discipline that focuses on the study of human behavior) as well as a social science (a scientific discipline that explores aspects of human society).

== Branches of economics ==
- Macroeconomics – branch of economics dealing with the performance, structure, behavior, and decision-making of an economy as a whole, rather than individual markets.
- Microeconomics – branch of economics that studies the behavior of individuals and firms in making decisions regarding the allocation of limited resources.

=== Subdisciplines of economics ===
- Agricultural economics – applied field of economics concerned with the application of economic theory in optimizing the production and distribution of food and fiber products.
- Attention economics – approach to the management of information that treats human attention as a scarce commodity and applies economic theory to solve various information management problems
- Behavioral economics – study of the psychological (e.g. cognitive, behavioral, affective, social) factors involved in the decisions of individuals or institutions, and how these decisions deviate from those implied by traditional economic theory.
- Classical economics – theory of market economies as largely self-regulating systems, governed by natural laws of production and exchange
- Comparative economic systems – sub-classification of economics dealing with the comparative study of different systems of economic organization, such as capitalism, socialism, feudalism and the mixed economy.
- Contract theory – how economic actors can and do construct contractual arrangements, generally in the presence of information asymmetry
- Cultural economics – branch of economics that studies the relation of culture to economic outcomes.
- Demographic economics – application of economic analysis to demography, the study of human populations, including size, growth, density, distribution, and vital statistics.
- Development economics – branch of economics that deals with economic aspects of the development process in low- and middle- income countries
- Ecological economics – transdisciplinary and interdisciplinary field of academic research addressing the interdependence and coevolution of human economies and natural ecosystems, both intertemporally and spatially.
- Econometrics – application of statistical methods to economic data in order to give empirical content to economic relationships.
- Economic anthropology – field that attempts to explain human economic behavior in its widest historic, geographic and cultural scope, an amalgamation of economics and anthropology.
- Economic development – process by which the economic well-being and quality of life of a nation, region, local community, or an individual are improved according to targeted goals and objectives.
- Economic geography – subfield of human geography that studies economic activity and factors affecting it. It can also be considered a subfield or method in economics.
- Economic history – study of history using methodological tools from economics or with a special attention to economic phenomena.
- Economic sociology – study of the social cause and effect of various economic phenomena
- Economics of marriage – economic analysis of household formation and break up, of production and distribution decisions within the household.
- Education economics – study of economic issues relating to education, including the demand for education, the financing and provision of education, and the comparative efficiency of various educational programs and policies.
- Energy economics – broad scientific subject area which includes topics related to supply and use of energy in societies.
- Engineering economics – subset of economics concerned with the use and application of economic principles in the analysis of engineering decisions.
- Entrepreneurial economics – field of study that focuses on the study of entrepreneur and entrepreneurship within the economy.
- Environmental economics –sub-field of economics concerned with environmental issues.
- Family economics – applies economic concepts such as production, division of labor, distribution, and decision making to the family.
- Feminist economics –critical study of economics and economies, with a focus on gender-aware and inclusive economic inquiry and policy analysis
- Financial economics –branch of economics characterized by a "concentration on monetary activities", in which "money of one type or another is likely to appear on both sides of a trade"
- Freiwirtschaft –economic theory and proposal for demurrage currency, community-owned land, and free trade.
- Georgism –economic theory and proposal holding that people should own the value that they produce themselves, while the economic rent derived from land—including from all natural resources, the commons, and urban locations—should belong equally to all members of society.
- Green economics –economy that aims at reducing environmental risks and ecological scarcities, and that aims for sustainable development without degrading the environment.
- Health economics –branch of economics concerned with issues related to efficiency, effectiveness, value and behavior in the production and consumption of health and healthcare.
- Heterodox economics –schools of economic thought which are not commonly perceived as belonging to mainstream economics.
- Humanistic economics pattern of economic thought which argue for "persons-first" economic theories as opposed to mainstream economic theories which are understood as often emphasizing financial gain over human well-being.
- Industrial organization –field that builds on the theory of the firm by examining the structure of (and, therefore, the boundaries between) firms and markets.
- Information economics –branch of microeconomics that studies how information and information systems affect an economy and economic decisions.
- International economics – concerned with the effects upon economic activity from international differences in productive resources and consumer preferences and the international institutions that affect them.
- Institutional economics – focuses on understanding the role of the evolutionary process and the role of institutions in shaping economic behavior.
- Labor economics – studies the functioning and dynamics of the markets for wage labour
- Law and economics – application of microeconomic theory to the analysis of law.
- Managerial economics – branch of economics involving the application of economic methods in the organizational decision-making process.
- Mathematical economics – application of mathematical methods to represent theories and analyze problems in economics.
- Monetary economics – branch of economics that studies the different theories of money
- Public finance – study of finance within government and role of the government in the economy
- Public economics – study of government policy through the lens of economic efficiency and equity.
- Real estate economics – application of economic techniques to real estate markets.
- Regional economics – economic advantage of a geographical location and human activities of greatest height to contribute maximally to the general growth and prosperity of the region.
- Regional science – field of economics concerned with analytical approaches to problems that are related specifically to regional and international issues.
- Resource economics – deals with the supply, demand, and allocation of the Earth's natural resources.
- Rural economics – study of rural economies, including both agricultural and non-agricultural industries
- Socialist economics – economic theories, practices and norms of hypothetical and existing socialist economic systems.
- Urban economics – economic study of urban areas; as such, it involves using the tools of economics to analyze urban issues such as crime, education, public transit, housing, and local government finance.
- Welfare economics – field of economics that applies microeconomic techniques to evaluate the overall well-being (welfare) of a society.

=== Methodologies or approaches ===
- Behavioural economics – study of the psychological (e.g. cognitive, behavioral, affective, social) factors involved in the decisions of individuals or institutions, and how these decisions deviate from those implied by traditional economic theory.
- Classical economics – theory of market economies as largely self-regulating systems, governed by natural laws of production and exchange
- Computational economics – interdisciplinary research discipline that combines methods in computational science and economics to solve complex economic problems.
- Econometrics – application of statistical methods to economic data in order to give empirical content to economic relationships.
- Evolutionary economics – school of economic thought that treats economic development as a process rather than an equilibrium and emphasizes change (qualitative, organisational, and structural), innovation, complex interdependencies, self-evolving systems, and limited rationality as the drivers of economic evolution.
- Experimental economics – application of experimental methods to study economic questions
- Praxeology (used by the Austrian School) – theory of human action, based on the notion that humans engage in purposeful behavior, contrary to reflexive behavior and other unintentional behavior.
- Social psychology – scientific study of how thoughts, feelings, and behaviors are influenced by the actual, imagined, or implied presence of others.

=== Interdisciplinary fields involving economics ===
- Bioeconomics (fisheries) – a model which combines biological characteristics of the fish stock (such as growth rate and carrying capacity) with economic information about the fishery (such as costs and revenue) to describe the fishing system.
- Constitutional economics – a research program in economics and constitutionalism that has been described as explaining the choice "of alternative sets of legal-institutional-constitutional rules that constrain the choices and activities of economic and political agents".
- Econophysics – non-orthodox (in economics) interdisciplinary research field, applying theories and methods originally developed by physicists in order to solve problems in economics,
- Neuroeconomics – interdisciplinary field that seeks to explain human decision-making, the ability to process multiple alternatives and to follow through on a plan of action and studies how economic behavior can shape our understanding of the brain, and how neuroscientific discoveries can guide models of economics.
- Political economy – branch of political science and economics studying economic systems (e.g. markets and national economies) and their governance by political systems (e.g. law, institutions, and government)
- Socioeconomics – branch of economics that focuses on the interrelationship between economic activity and social behavior.
- Thermoeconomics – heterodox economics that applies the laws of statistical mechanics to economic theory
- Transport economics – branch of economics that deals with the allocation of resources within the transport sector.

== Types of economies ==
Economy – system of human activities related to the production, distribution, exchange, and consumption of goods and services of a country or other area.

=== Economies, by political & social ideological structure ===
- Economic ideology – set of views forming the basis of an ideology on how the economy should run.
  - Capitalist economy – economic system based on the private ownership of the means of production and their operation for profit.
  - Planned economy – type of economic system where investment, production and the allocation of capital goods takes place according to economy-wide economic plans and production plans.
  - Consumer economy – economy driven by consumer spending as a high percent of its gross domestic product (GDP), as opposed to other major components of GDP (gross private domestic investment, government spending, and imports netted against exports).
    - Consumerism – social and economic order in which the aspirations of many individuals include the acquisition of goods and services beyond those necessary for survival or traditional displays of status.
  - Corporate economy – political system of interest representation and policymaking whereby corporate groups, such as agricultural, labour, military, business, scientific, or guild associations, come together and negotiate contracts or policy (collective bargaining) on the basis of their common interests.
  - Fascist economy – so-called economic system in fascism that is distinct from those advocated by other ideologies, comprising essential characteristics that fascist nations shared. Historians and other scholars disagree on the question of whether a specifically fascist type of economic policy can be said to exist.
  - Laissez-faire – type of economic system in which transactions between private groups of people are free from any form of economic interventionism (such as subsidies or regulations).
  - Mercantilism – nationalist economic policy that is designed to maximize the exports and minimize the imports of an economy.
  - Natural economy – type of economy in which money is not used in the transfer of resources among people.
  - Primitive communism – gift economies of hunter-gatherers throughout history, where resources and property hunted or gathered are shared with all members of a group in accordance with individual needs
  - Social market economy – socioeconomic model combining a free-market capitalist economic system alongside social policies and enough regulation to establish both fair competition within the market and generally a welfare state.
  - Socialist economy – economic system is characterized by social ownership and operation of the means of production.

=== Economies, by scope ===
- Anglo-Saxon economy – a regulated market-based economic model practiced in Anglosphere countries such as the United Kingdom, the United States, Canada, New Zealand, Australia and Ireland.
- American School – macroeconomic philosophy that dominated United States national policies from the time of the American Civil War until the mid-20th century, characterised by protectionism, government investment in infrastructure, and a national bank that promotes the growth of productive enterprises rather than speculation.
- Barter economy – an economy where transactions are direct exchanges of goods or services for other goods or services without using a medium of exchange, such as credit or money.
- Hunter-gatherer economy – economic systems of societies that rely on hunting wild animals and gathering wild plants for sustenance.
- Information economy – economy with an increased emphasis on informational activities and information industry, where information is valued as a capital good.
- Interest-free economy – an economy that does not have pure interest rates.
- New industrial economy – socioeconomic classification for a subset of developing countries whose economic growth is much higher than that of other developing countries; and where the social consequences of industrialization, such as urbanization, are reorganizing society.
- Palace economy – system of economic organization in which a substantial share of the wealth flows into the control of a centralized administration, the palace, and out from there to the general population.
- Plantation economy – economy based on agricultural mass production, usually of a few commodity crops, grown on large farms worked by laborers or slaves
- Token economy – system that rewards people for desired behaviors with tokens, which can be exchanged for rewards. It's a behavior therapy technique that's based on operant conditioning.
- Traditional economy – an economic system based on customs, traditions, and beliefs passed down through generations.
- Transition economy – economy which is changing from a centrally planned economy to a market economy.
- World economy – economy of all humans in the world, referring to the global economic system, which includes all economic activities conducted both within and between nations, including production, consumption, economic management, work in general, financial transactions and trade of goods and services.

=== Economies, by regulation ===
- Closed economy – an economic system of self-sufficiency and limited trade with outside world.
- Dual economy – existence of two separate economic sectors within one country, divided by different levels of development, technology, and different patterns of demand.
- Gift economy – system of exchange where valuables are not sold, but rather given without an explicit agreement for immediate or future rewards.
- Informal economy – part of any economy that is neither taxed nor monitored by any form of government.
- Market economy – economic system in which the decisions regarding investment, production, and distribution to the consumers are guided by the price signals created by the forces of supply and demand.
- Mixed economy economic system that includes both elements associated with capitalism, such as private businesses, and with socialism, such as nationalized government services.
- Open economy – economy in which both domestic and international entities participate in the trade of goods and services.
- Participatory economy economic system based on participatory decision making as the primary economic mechanism for allocation in society.
- Planned economy – economic system where investment, production and the allocation of capital goods takes place according to economy-wide economic plans and production plans.
- Subsistence economy – economy directed to basic subsistence (the provision of food, clothing and shelter) rather than to the market.
- Underground economy – economic activities that circumvent, escape, or are excluded from the institutional system of rules, rights, regulations, and enforcement penalties that govern formal agents engaged in production and exchange.
- Virtual economy – emergent economy existing in a virtual world, usually exchanging virtual goods in the context of an online game, particularly in massively multiplayer online games (MMOs).

== Economic elements ==
=== Economic activities ===
- Business – any activity or enterprise entered into for profit.
  - Business cycle – intervals of general expansion followed by recession in economic performance.
- Collective action – action taken together by a group of people whose goal is to enhance their condition and achieve a common objective.
- Commerce – organized system of activities, functions, procedures and institutions that directly or indirectly contribute to the smooth, unhindered large-scale distribution and transfer (exchange through buying and selling) of goods and services at the right time, place, quantity, quality and price through various channels among the original producers and the final consumers within local, regional, national or international economies.
- Competition – different economic firms in contention to obtain goods that are limited by varying the elements of the marketing mix: price, product, promotion and place.
- Consumption – use of resources to fulfill present needs and desires
- Distribution – the way total output, income, or wealth is distributed among individuals or among the factors of production (such as labour, land, and capital).
- Employment – relationship between two parties regulating the provision of paid labour services.
- Entrepreneurship – creation or extraction of economic value in ways that generally entail beyond the minimal amount of risk
- Export – a good produced in one country that is sold into another country or a service provided in one country for a national or resident of another country.
- Finance – monetary resources and to the study and discipline of money, currency, assets and liabilities.
- Government spending – all government consumption, investment, and transfer payments.
- Import – part of the International Trade which involves buying and receiving of goods or services produced in another country.
- Investment – commitment of resources to achieve later benefits
- Mergers and acquisitions – business transactions in which the ownership of companies, business organizations, or their operating units are transferred to or consolidated with another company or business organization.
- Pricing – process whereby a business sets and displays the price at which it will sell its products and services and may be part of the business's marketing plan.
  - Geographical pricing – practice of modifying a basic list price based on the geographical location of the buyer.
- Production – process of combining various inputs, both material (such as metal, wood, glass, or plastics) and immaterial (such as plans, or knowledge) in order to create output.
- Trade – the transfer of goods and services from one person or entity to another, often in exchange for money.
  - Balance of trade – difference between the monetary value of a nation's exports and imports of goods over a certain time period.
  - Fair trade – arrangement designed to help producers in developing countries achieve sustainable and equitable trade relationships.
  - Free trade – trade policy that does not restrict imports or exports.
  - International trade – exchange of capital, goods, and services across international borders or territories
  - Safe trade
  - Tax – mandatory financial charge or levy imposed on an individual or legal entity by a governmental organization to support government spending and public expenditures collectively or to regulate and reduce negative externalities.
  - Terms of trade – relative price of exports in terms of imports, defined as the ratio of export prices to import prices
  - Trade bloc – intergovernmental agreement, often part of a regional intergovernmental organization, where barriers to trade (tariffs and others) are reduced or eliminated among the participating states.
  - Trade pact – wide-ranging taxes, tariff and trade treaty that often includes investment guarantees.
  - Trade route – logistical network identified as a series of pathways and stoppages used for the commercial transport of cargo.

=== Economic forces ===
- Aggregate demand – total demand for final goods and services in an economy at a given time.
- Aggregate supply – total supply of goods and services that firms in a national economy plan on selling during a specific time period.
- Deflation – decrease in the general price level of goods and services.
- Economic activity (see above)
- Economies of agglomeration – how urban agglomeration occurs in locations where cost savings can naturally arise.
- Economies of scale – cost advantages that enterprises obtain due to their scale of operation, and are typically measured by the amount of output produced per unit of cost (production cost) .
- Economies of scope – cost savings formed by broadening production/services through diversified products.
- Incentive – anything that persuade a person or organization[2] to alter their behavior to produce the desired outcome.
- Inflation – general increase in the prices of goods and services in an economy
  - Hyperinflation – very high and typically accelerating inflation. It quickly erodes the real value of the local currency, as the prices of all goods increase.
- Invisible hand – the incentives which free markets sometimes create for self-interested people to accidentally act in the public interest, even when this is not something they intended.
- Preference – preference refers to an order by which an agent, while in search of an "optimal choice", ranks alternatives based on their respective utility.
- Profit motive – motivation of firms that operate so as to maximize their profits.

==== Economic problems ====
- Depression – period of carried long-term economic downturn that is the result of lowered economic activity in one or more major national economies
- Financial crisis – situations in which some financial assets suddenly lose a large part of their nominal value.
- Hyperinflation – very high and typically accelerating inflation.
- Poverty – condition in which an individual lacks the financial resources and essentials for a basic standard of living.
- Recession – business cycle contraction that occurs when there is a period of broad decline in economic activity.
  - List of recessions
- Stagflation – combination of high inflation, stagnant economic growth, and elevated unemployment.
- Unemployment – proportion of people above a specified age (usually 15)[2] not being in paid employment or self-employment but currently available for work during the reference period

==== Trends and influences ====
- Decentralization – process by which the activities of an organization, particularly those related to planning and decision-making, are distributed or delegated away from a central, authoritative location or group and given to smaller factions within it.
- Globalization – widespread international movement of goods, capital, services, technology and information.
- Industrialisation – period of social and economic change that transforms a human group from an agrarian society into an industrial society, involving an extensive reorganisation of an economy for the purpose of manufacturing.
- Internationalization – process of increasing involvement of enterprises in international markets,

=== Economic measures ===
- Consumer price index – statistical estimate of the level of prices of goods and services bought for consumption purposes by households.
- Economic indicator – statistic about an economic activity to allow analysis of economic performance and predictions of future performance.
- Human Development Index – statistical composite index of life expectancy, education (mean years of schooling completed and expected years of schooling upon entering the education system), and per capita income indicators, used to rank countries into four tiers of human development.
- Measures of national income and output – used in economics to estimate total economic activity in a country or region
  - Gross domestic product – monetary measure of the total market value of all the final goods and services produced and rendered in a specific time period by a country or countries
    - Natural gross domestic product – highest level of real gross domestic product (potential output) that can be sustained over the long term
  - Gross national product – market value of all the goods and services produced in one year by labor and property supplied by the citizens of a country.
  - National income – amount of factor incomes earned by the residents of a country
  - Net national income – net national product (NNP) minus indirect taxes
- Poverty level – minimum level of income deemed adequate in a particular country
- Standard of living – level of income, comforts and services available to an individual, community or society.
- UN Human Development Index – statistical composite index of life expectancy, education (mean years of schooling completed and expected years of schooling upon entering the education system), and per capita income indicators, which is used to rank countries into four tiers of human development
- Value – measure of the benefit provided by a good or service to an economic agent
  - Cost-of-production theory of value – theory that the price of an object or condition is determined by the sum of the cost of the resources that went into making it.
  - Labor theory of value – theory of value that argues that the exchange value of a good or service is determined by the total amount of "socially necessary labor" required to produce it.
  - Surplus value – difference between the amount raised through a sale of a product and the amount it cost to manufacture it
  - Time value of money – fact that there is normally a greater benefit to receiving a sum of money now rather than an identical sum later
  - Value added – difference between market value of a product or service, and the sum value of its constituents.
  - Value of Earth – net worth of Earth, equated with the sum of all ecosystem services as evaluated in ecosystem valuation or full-cost accounting.
  - Value of life – economic value used to quantify the benefit of avoiding a fatality
- Measuring well-being – an individual's perception of their position in life in the context of the culture and value systems in which they live and in relation to their goals, expectations, standards and concerns
- Working time – period of time that a person spends at paid labor.

=== Economic participants ===
- Employer – a person conducting a business or undertaking who recruits labour and expertise
- Employee – a person who contributes labour and expertise to an endeavor of an employer
- Entrepreneur – individual who creates and/or invests in one or more businesses, bearing most of the risks and enjoying most of the rewards
- Central bank – institution that manages the monetary policy of a country or monetary union
- Reproductive labor – work that is often associated with care giving and domestic housework roles including cleaning, cooking, child care, and the unpaid domestic labor force

=== Economic politics ===
- Antitrust – field of law that promotes or seeks to maintain market competition by regulating anti-competitive conduct by companies.
- Cartel – group of independent market participants who collude with each other as well as agreeing not to compete with each other in order to improve their profits and dominate the market
- Government-granted monopoly – form of coercive monopoly by which a government grants exclusive privilege to a private individual or firm to be the sole provider of a good or service
- Reaganomics – neoliberal economic policies promoted by U.S. President Ronald Reagan during the 1980s, focusing mainly on supply-side economics.
- Taxation – imposition of tax, i.e. a mandatory financial charge or levy imposed on an individual or legal entity by a governmental organization to support government spending and public expenditures collectively or to regulate and reduce negative externalities.
  - Income tax – a tax imposed on individuals or entities (taxpayers) in respect of the income or profits earned by them (commonly called taxable income)
  - Land value tax – levy on the value of land without regard to buildings, personal property and other improvements upon it.
  - Sales tax – tax paid to a governing body for the sales of certain goods and services.
  - Tariff – duty imposed by a national government, customs territory, or supranational union on imports of goods and is paid by the importer.
  - Value-added tax – consumption tax that is levied on the value added at each stage of a product's production and distribution

==== Economic policy ====
Economic policy – all strategic interventions by public administrations – including the state, central bank, and local authorities – across economic activity, aimed at achieving objectives like growth, full employment, and social justice, thereby correcting existing imbalances.

- Agricultural policy – Government actions targeting the agricultural sector to achieve objectives like food security, farmer income, and environmental sustainability.
- Fiscal policy – Government actions related to taxation and expenditure to manage aggregate demand, influence economic activity, and achieve macroeconomic objectives.
- Incomes policy – Government actions to directly influence wage and price levels, often to control inflation or manage the distribution of income.
  - Price controls – Government-imposed restrictions on the prices that can be charged for goods and services, typically implemented as maximum prices (price ceilings) or minimum prices (price floors) to manage affordability or ensure minimum returns for producers.
    - Price ceiling – Government-imposed maximum prices that can be charged for specific goods or services, typically set below the market equilibrium to increase affordability, potentially leading to shortages.
      - Rent control – Government-imposed regulations limiting the amount landlords can charge for rental housing and the rate at which rents can be increased, typically implemented to address housing affordability
    - Price floor – Government-imposed minimum price that must be charged for a specific good or service, typically set above the market equilibrium to support producers. potentially leading to surplus.
      - Minimum wage – Legally required lowest hourly pay for workers, serving as a price floor for labor to protect workers against unduly low pay and ensure a basic standard of living.
- Industrial policy – proactive government-led encouragement and development of specific strategic industries for the growth of all or part of the economy, especially in absence of sufficient private sector investments and participation.
- Infrastructure-based development – development where a substantial proportion of a nation's resources must be systematically directed towards long term assets such as transportation, energy and social infrastructure in the name of long-term economic efficiency and social equity
- Investment policy – government regulation or law that encourages or discourages foreign investment in the local economy, e.g. currency exchange limits
- Monetary policy – policy adopted by the monetary authority of a nation to affect monetary and other financial conditions to accomplish broader objectives like high employment and price stability
  - Disinflation – decrease in the rate of inflation – a slowdown in the rate of increase of the general price level of goods and services in a nation's gross domestic product over time
  - Inflation targeting – monetary policy where a central bank follows an explicit target for the inflation rate for the medium-term and announces this inflation target to the public
  - Monetary hawk and dove – someone who advocates keeping inflation low as the top priority in monetary policy (hawk) and someone who emphasizes other issues, especially low unemployment, over low inflation (dove).
  - Monetary reform – movement or theory that proposes a system of supplying money and financing the economy that is different from the current system
  - Quantitative easing – monetary policy action where a central bank purchases predetermined amounts of government bonds or other financial assets in order to stimulate economic activity
  - Reflation – return of prices to a previous rate of inflation
- Policy mix – combination of a country's monetary policy and fiscal policy. These two channels influence growth and employment, and are generally determined by the central bank and the government (e.g., the United States Congress) respectively.
- Stabilization policy – set of measures introduced to stabilize a financial system or economy (business cycle stabilization or credit cycle stabilization)
- Tax policy – guidelines and principles established by a government for the imposition and collection of taxes

=== Infrastructure ===
Infrastructure – set of facilities and systems that serve a country, city, or other area, and encompasses the services and facilities necessary for its economy, households and firms to function.

=== Markets ===
Market – composition of systems, institutions, procedures, social relations or infrastructures whereby parties engage in exchange.

==== Types of markets ====
- Black market – clandestine market or series of transactions that has some aspect of illegality, or is not compliant with an institutional set of rules.
- Commodity market – market that trades in the primary economic sector rather than manufactured products, i.e. agricultural products, energy products, and metals.
- Financial market – market in which people trade financial securities and derivatives at low transaction costs.
  - Bond market – financial market in which participants can issue new debt, known as the primary market, or buy and sell debt securities, known as the secondary market.
  - Money market – component of the economy that provides short-term funds, dealing in short-term loans, generally for a period of a year or less.
  - Spot market – public financial market in which financial instruments or commodities are traded for immediate delivery.
  - Secondary market – financial market in which previously issued financial instruments such as stock, bonds, options, and futures are bought and sold.
  - Third market – trading of exchange-listed securities in the over-the-counter (OTC) market.
  - Fourth market – direct institution-to-institution trading without using the service of broker-dealers, thus avoiding both commissions and the bid–ask spread.
  - Stock market – aggregation of buyers and sellers of stocks (also called shares), which represent ownership claims on businesses.
- Free market – economic system in which the prices of goods and services are determined by supply and demand expressed by sellers and buyers, operating without the intervention of government or any other external authority.
- Labor market – the supply of and demand for labour or employment in a particular country or area, i.e., transactions involving the buying and selling of the ability to work.
- Mass market – market for goods produced on a large scale for a significant number of end consumers.
- Niche market – subset of the market on which a product is appealed to a small group of consumers.
- Media market – region where the population can receive the same (or similar) television and radio station offerings, and may also include other types of media such as newspapers and internet content.
- Regulated market – idealized system where the government or other organizations oversee the market, control the forces of supply and demand, and to some extent regulate the market actions.

==== Aspects of markets ====
- Market failure – situation in which the allocation of goods and services by a free market is not Pareto efficient, often leading to a net loss of economic value.
- Market power – ability of a firm to influence the price at which it sells a product or service by manipulating either the supply or demand of the product or service to increase economic profit.
- Market share – percentage of the total revenue or sales in a market that a company's business makes up.
- Market structure – depicts how firms are differentiated and categorised based on the types of goods they sell (homogeneous/heterogeneous) and how their operations are affected by external factors and elements.
- Market system – systematic process enabling many market players to offer and demand: helping buyers and sellers interact and make deals.
- Market transparency – the state where much is known by many about what products and services or capital assets are available, market depth (quantity available), what price, and where.
- Market trend – upward or downward movement of a market, during a period of time.
- Market dominance – control of an economic market by a firm, which possesses the power to affect competition and influence market price

==== Market forms ====
Market form

- Perfect competition, in which the market consists of a very large number of firms producing a homogeneous product.
- Monopolistic competition, also called competitive market, where there are a large number of independent firms which have a very small proportion of the market share.
- Monopoly, where there is only one provider of a product or service.
- Monopsony, when there is only one buyer in a market.
- Natural monopoly, a monopoly in which economies of scale cause efficiency to increase continuously with the size of the firm.
- Oligopoly, in which a market is dominated by a small number of firms which own more than 40% of the market share.
- Oligopsony, a market dominated by many sellers and a few buyers.

==== Market-oriented activities ====
- Market analysis
- Marketing
  - Market segmentation
- Market intelligence
- Market research

=== Money ===
Money – a medium of exchange, a unit of account, a store of value and sometimes, a standard of deferred payment.

- Commodity money – money whose value comes from a commodity of which it is made.
- Currency – standardized money in common use, usually for people in a nation state.
  - Hard currency – any globally traded currency that serves as a reliable and stable store of value.
  - Fiat money – a type of government-issued currency that is not backed by a precious metal, such as gold or silver, nor by any other tangible asset or commodity.
  - Demurrage currency – a type of money that is designed to only be a temporary store of value.
  - Local currency – currency that can be spent in a particular geographical locality at participating organisations.
  - Petrocurrency – Dollars paid to oil-producing nations (petrodollar recycling); Currencies of oil-producing nations which tend to rise in value against other currencies when the price of oil rises; Pricing of oil in US dollars.
  - Reserve currency – foreign currency that is held in significant quantities by central banks or other monetary authorities as part of their foreign exchange reserves.
  - Time-based currency – alternative currency or exchange system where the unit of account is the person-hour or some other time unit.
- Monetary reform – movement or theory that proposes a system of supplying money and financing the economy that is different from the current system
- Monetary system – system by which a government provides money in a country's economy
- Money supply – total volume of money held by the public at a particular point in time

=== Resources ===
Resource

==== Resource management ====
Resource management

- Natural resource management
- Resource allocation

==== Factors of production ====
Factors of production

===== Land =====
Land

- Natural resources

===== Labor =====
- Division of labour
- Workplace

===== Capital =====
Capital – durable produced goods that are in turn used as productive inputs for further production of goods and services

- Capital asset – property of any kind held by an assessee
- Capital intensity – amount of fixed or real capital present in relation to other factors of production, especially labor
- Financial capital – any economic resource measured in terms of money used by entrepreneurs and businesses to buy what they need to make their products or to provide their services to the sector of the economy upon which their operation is based
- Human capital – concept used by economists to designate personal attributes considered useful in the production process, encompassing employee knowledge, skills, know-how, good health, and education
- Individual capital – economic view of talent, comprises inalienable or personal traits of persons, tied to their bodies and available only through their own free will
- Natural capital – world's stock of natural resources, which includes geology, soils, air, water and all living organisms
- Social capital – networks of relationships which are productive towards advancing the goals of individuals and groups.
- Wealth – abundance of valuable financial assets or physical possessions which can be converted into a form that can be used for transactions

== Economic theory ==
- Consumer theory – branch of microeconomics that relates preferences to consumption expenditures and to consumer demand curves.
- Efficiency wage hypothesis – hypothesis of wage paid in excess of the market-clearing wage to increase the labor productivity of workers
- Efficient market hypothesis – hypothesis in financial economics that states that asset prices reflect all available information
- Marginalism – theory of economics that attempts to explain the discrepancy in the value of goods and services by reference to their secondary, or marginal, utility
- Prospect theory – theory of behavioral economics, judgment and decision making that describes how individuals assess their loss and gain perspectives in an asymmetric manner
- Public choice theory – use of economic tools to deal with traditional problems of political science
- Rational choice theory – use of decision theory as a set of guidelines to help understand economic and social behavior

=== Economic ideologies ===
- Consumerism – social and economic order in which the aspirations of many individuals include the acquisition of goods and services beyond those necessary for survival or traditional displays of status.
- Monetarism –school of thought in monetary economics that emphasizes the role of policy-makers in controlling the amount of money in circulation.
- Productivism –belief that measurable productivity and growth are the purpose of human organization (e.g., work), and that "more production is necessarily good"
- Utilitarianism – family of normative ethical theories that prescribe actions that maximize happiness and well-being for the affected individuals.

== History of economics ==
=== History of economic thought ===
History of economic thought

- Ancient economic thought
  - Aristotle
    - Nicomachean Ethics
- Economics of the Age of Enlightenment
- Mercantilism
  - British Enlightenment
    - John Locke
    - Dudley North
    - David Hume
  - French Enlightenment: Physiocracy
    - François Quesnay
      - Tableau économique
      - Anne Robert Jacques Turgot
      - Reflections on the Formation and Distribution of Wealth
- Classical economics, political economy
  - Adam Smith
    - The Wealth of Nations
  - David Ricardo
- Socialist economics
  - Marxian economics
    - Labour theory of value
  - Anarchist economics
- Austrian School of Economics
  - Carl Menger
  - Friedrich von Hayek
  - Ludwig von Mises
- Neoclassical economics
  - Léon Walras
  - John Bates Clark
  - Alfred Marshall
- Keynesian economics
  - John Maynard Keynes
    - Cambridge capital controversy
- Neo-Keynesian economics
  - Paul Samuelson
  - John Hicks (economist)
    - Neoclassical synthesis
- Post-Keynesian economics
  - Hyman Minsky
  - Joan Robinson
  - Michał Kalecki
- New Keynesian economics
- Chicago school of economics
  - Milton Friedman
    - Monetarism

=== Economic history ===
Economic history

- Economic events
  - Economic history of the world
    - Economics in the Middle Ages: feudalism and manorialism
    - Economics of the Renaissance: mercantilism
    - Industrial Revolution
    - Economic history of World War I
  - Nixon shock
- Economic history by region
  - Economic history of Africa
    - Economic History of Ethiopia
    - Economic history of Morocco
    - Economic history of Nigeria
    - Economic history of Somalia
    - Economic history of South Africa
    - Economic history of Zimbabwe
  - Economic history of the Arab world
  - Economic history of Asia
    - Economic history of Cambodia
    - Economic history of China
      - Economic history of China before 1912
      - Economic history of China (1912–1949)
      - Economic history of China (1949–present)
      - Economic history of the Republic of China
    - Economic history of India
    - Economic history of Indonesia
    - Economic history of Iran
    - Economic history of Japan
    - Economic history of Malaysia
    - Economic history of Pakistan
    - Economic history of Taiwan
    - Economic history of Turkey
      - Economic history of the Ottoman Empire
    - Economic history of Vietnam
    - Economic history of the Philippines
  - Economic history of Australia
  - Economic history of Europe
    - Economic history of France
    - Economic history of Germany
      - Economic history of the German reunification
    - Economic history of Greece and the Greek world
    - Economic history of Iceland
    - Economic history of Ireland
    - Economic history of Italy
    - Economic history of Portugal
    - Economic history of Scotland
    - Economic history of Spain
    - Economic history of Sweden
    - Economic History of Switzerland
    - Economic history of Venice
    - Economic history of the Netherlands (1500–1815)
    - Economic history of the Republic of Ireland
    - Economic history of the Russian Federation
    - Economic history of the United Kingdom
  - Economic history of North America
    - Economic history of Canada
    - Economic history of Mexico
    - Economic history of the United States
  - Economic history of Central America
    - Economic history of Nicaragua
  - Economic history of South America
    - Economic history of Argentina
    - Economic history of Brazil
    - Economic history of Chile
    - Economic history of Colombia
    - Economic history of Ecuador
    - Economic history of Peru
- Economic history by subject
  - History of banking
  - History of money
  - History of stock markets

== General economic concepts ==
- Ricardian economics – economic theories of David Ricardo, an English political economist, especially the concept of comparative advantage and its implications for international trade and economic growth
- Keynesian economics – various macroeconomic theories and models, named after British economist John Maynard Keynes, of how aggregate demand (total spending in the economy) strongly influences economic output and inflation
- Classical economics – theory of market economies as largely self-regulating systems, governed by natural laws of production and exchange (famously captured by Adam Smith's metaphor of the invisible hand)
- Neo-Keynesian economics – academic movement and paradigm in economics that worked towards reconciling the macroeconomic thought of John Maynard Keynes with neoclassical economics.
- Neoclassical economics – approach to economics in which the production, consumption, and valuation (pricing) of goods and services are observed as driven by the supply and demand model
- New classical economics – school of thought in macroeconomics that builds its analysis entirely on a neoclassical framework
- New Keynesian economics – school of macroeconomics that strives to provide microeconomic foundations for Keynesian economics
- Participatory economics – economic system based on participatory decision making as the primary economic mechanism for allocation in society
- Home economics – subject concerning human development, personal and family finances, consumer issues, housing and interior design, nutrition and food preparation, as well as textiles and apparel
- Goods
  - Complement good
  - Coordination good
  - Free goods
  - Inferior goods
  - Normal goods
  - Public good
  - Substitute good
- isms
  - Capitalism
    - Natural Capitalism
  - Economic subjectivism
  - Socialism
- Modern portfolio theory
- Game theory
- Human development theory
- Production theory basics
- Time preference theory of interest
- Agent
- Arbitrage
- Big Mac Index
- Big push model
- Cash crop
- Canadian and American economies compared
- Catch-up effect
- Chicago school
- Collusion
- Commodity
- Comparative advantage
- Competitive advantage
- complementarity
- Consumer and producer surplus
- Cost
  - Cost-benefit analysis
  - Cost-of-living index
- Debt
- Devaluation
- Disposable income
- Economic
  - Economic data
  - Economic efficiency
  - Economic growth
  - Economic globalization
  - Economic profits
  - Economic modeling
  - Economic reports
  - Economic sector
  - Economic system
- Ecosystem services
- Elasticity
- Environmental finance
- Euro
- Event study
- Experience economy
- Externality
- Factor price equalization
- Federal Reserve
- Financial instruments
- Fiscal neutrality
- Full-reserve banking
- General equilibrium
- Gold standard
- Import substitution
- Income
- Income elasticity of demand
- Income velocity of money
- Induced demand
- Industrial organization
- Input-output model
- Interest
- Keynes, John Maynard
- Knowledge-based economy
- Laissez-faire
- Land
- Living wage
- Local purchasing
- Lorenz curve
- Marginal Revolution
- Means of production
- Mental accounting
- Menu costs
- Missing market
- Model - economics
- Model - macroeconomics
- Monopoly profit
- Moral hazard
- Moral purchasing
- Multiplier (economics)
- Neo-classical growth model
- Network effect
- Network externality
- Operations research
- Opportunity cost
- Output
- Parable of the broken window
- Pareto efficiency
- Price
- Price discrimination
- Price elasticity of demand
- Price points
- Outline of industrial organization
- Production function
- Productivity
- Profit (economics)
- Profit maximization
- Public bad
- Public debt
- Purchasing power parity
- Rahn curve
- Rate of return pricing
- Rational expectations
- Rational pricing
- Real business cycle
- Real versus nominal in economics
- Regression analysis
- Returns to scale
- Risk premium
- Saving
- Scarcity
- Seven-generation sustainability
- Slavery
- Social cost
- Social credit
- Social welfare
- Stock exchange
- Subsidy
  - Corporate welfare
- Subsistence agriculture
- Sunk cost
- Supply and demand
- Supply-side economics
- Sustainable competitive advantage
- Sustainable development
- Sweatshop
- Technostructure
- The Theory of Moral Sentiments by Adam Smith
- Transaction cost
- Triple bottom line
- Trust
- Utility
- Utility maximization problem
- Uneconomic growth
- U.S. public debt
- Virtuous circle and vicious circle
- Wage rate
- X-efficiency
- Yield
- Zero sum game

== Economics organizations ==
- American Economic Association
- American Institute for Economic Research
- American Law and Economics Association
- Association for Evolutionary Economics
- Association for Social Economics
- Canadian Economics Association
- Centre for Economic Policy Research
- China Center for Economic Research
- Eastern Economic Association
- Econometric Society
- European Economic Association
- International Association for Feminist Economics
- International Economic Association
- Latin American and Caribbean Economic Association
- National Association for Business Economics
- National Bureau of Economic Research
- Royal Economic Society
- Southern Economic Association
- Western Economic Association International

== Economics publications ==
- List of economics journals
- List of important publications in economics

== Persons influential in the field of economics ==
- List of economists

=== Nobel Memorial Prize–winning economic historians ===
- Milton Friedman won the Nobel Memorial Prize in Economic Sciences in 1976 for "his achievements in the fields of consumption analysis, monetary history and theory and for his demonstration of the complexity of stabilization policy".
- Robert Fogel and Douglass North won the Nobel Memorial Prize in 1993 for "having renewed research in economic history by applying economic theory and quantitative methods in order to explain economic and institutional change".
- Merton Miller, who started his academic career teaching economic history at the LSE, won the Nobel Memorial Prize in 1990 with Harry Markowitz and William F. Sharpe.

==== Other notable economic historians ====
- Moses Abramovitz
- T. S. Ashton
- Roger E. Backhouse
- Correlli Barnett
- Jörg Baten
- Maxine Berg
- Ben Bernanke
- Fernand Braudel
- Rondo Cameron
- Sydney Checkland
- Carlo M. Cipolla
- Gregory Clark
- Thomas C. Cochran
- Nicholas Crafts
- Louis Cullen
- Peter Davies
- Brad DeLong
- Barry Eichengreen
- Stanley Engerman
- Charles Feinstein
- Niall Ferguson
- Ronald Findlay
- Roderick Floud
- Claudia Goldin
- John Habakkuk
- Earl J. Hamilton
- Eli Heckscher
- Eric Hobsbawm
- Leo Huberman
- Thomas M. Humphrey
- Harold James
- Ibn Khaldun
- Charles P. Kindleberger
- John Komlos
- Emmanuel Le Roy Ladurie
- David Laidler
- David Landes
- Tim Leunig
- Friedrich List
- Robert Sabatino Lopez
- Angus Maddison
- Karl Marx
- Peter Mathias
- Ellen McArthur
- Deirdre McCloskey
- Joel Mokyr
- Cormac Ó Gráda
- Henri Pirenne
- Karl Polanyi
- Erik S. Reinert
- Christina Romer
- W. W. Rostow
- Murray Rothbard
- Larry Schweikart
- Ram Sharan Sharma
- Adam Smith
- Anna Jacobson Schwartz
- Robert Skidelsky
- Graeme Snooks
- R. H. Tawney
- Peter Temin
- Richard Timberlake
- Adam Tooze
- Eberhard Wächtler
- Jeffrey Williamson
- Tony Wrigley

== See also ==
- Index of accounting articles
- Index of economics articles
- Index of international trade topics
- JEL classification codes
- List of business theorists
- List of economic communities
- List of economics awards
- List of free trade agreements
- Outline of business management
- Outline of commercial law
- Outline of community
- Outline of finance
- Outline of marketing
- Outline of management
- Outline of production
