= Economy of China (disambiguation) =

The economy of China refers to the economy of the People's Republic of China (mainland China).

Economy of China may also refer to:

- Economic history of China
  - Economic history of China (1912–1949) (Republic of China on the mainland)
  - Economic history of China (1949–present) (People's Republic of China)
- Economies of the Special Administrative Regions of China
  - Economy of Hong Kong
  - Economy of Macau
- Economy of Taiwan (Republic of China on Taiwan after 1949)
