= Economic history of the Republic of China =

The economic history of the Republic of China is covered in the following articles:

- Economic history of China (1912–49), the economic history of the Republic of China during the period when it controlled mainland China from 1912 to 1949.
- Economic history of Taiwan#Modern history, the economic history of the Republic of China during the period when it only controls Taiwan area after 1949.

== See also ==
- Sino-German cooperation (1926–1941)
- German–Japanese industrial co-operation before World War II
- Economy of Taiwan
- Economic history of Taiwan
- Economic history of China
