= Economic history of Morocco =

The Economic History of Morocco reflects the country’s strategic role in Mediterranean trade and its interactions with European powers, particularly from the eighteenth century onward. Moroccan corsair activity led to numerous treaties with European states that secured maritime commerce, provided privileges to foreign consuls and merchants, and granted varying degrees of concessions, with France and England obtaining the most favorable terms. At the same time, Morocco experienced recurrent social crises, as droughts, locust invasions, and political unrest triggered devastating famines and epidemics that weakened social stability, partly alleviated through grain imports from Europe. Despite these challenges, Morocco’s proximity to Europe, its active port cities such as Essaouira and Tangier, and the commercial networks of its Jewish minority helped strengthen external trade, making the country a distinctive economic hub in the Maghreb.

Historical GDP per capita development of Morocco

== Saadi dynasty ==
The institution of Tujjar as-Sultan, in which major Jewish merchants were granted long distance trading privileges, was established in the Saadi period.

== 18th century ==
Sultan Muhammad III instated the maks (مَكس) or mukūs (مُكوس), a non-Quranic tax, and opened his kingdom to commerce with Europe.

== 19th century ==
By mid-century, Morocco was in a monetary crisis caused by the decline in value of its currency. Traditionally, the monetary system in Morocco consisted of a golden mithqal (مثقال), divided into ten uqiyyahs (أوقية), each of which was divided into four muzunas (موزونة), each of which was divided into 48 copper or bronze fils (فِلس). Foreign coins began to flood the Moroccan market, the Makhzen allowed them to be used as legal tender, and locally minted coins began to lose value against them.

Attempting to stabilize the currency, Sultan Muhammad minted a silver muhammadi dirham (درهم محمدي) with a fixed exchange rate with bronze coins. It only circulated for a short time. Succeeding sultans attempted similar strategies: minting new coins, readjusting the rate of exchange to account for inflation, and imposing new taxes to stabilize income for the Makhzen. This dynamic was unfavorable for the less fortunate, who went into debt with rising inflation. In 1864, the price of foodstuffs soared to the point where people had to sell their jewelry and goods for a fraction of their value.

This trend—as well as increasing revenues from ports, cash salaries for the growing bureaucratic class, and calculating national expenses and planning annual budgets—indicate the transformation of the Moroccan economy into a modern monetarized cash economy.

In 1860, the Treaty of Wad Ras following the Hispano-Moroccan War forced Morocco to pay a war indemnity of 20 million duro (equivalent to $4 million 1861 US dollars)—far greater the balance of the Makhzen's treasury. Morocco borrowed £500,000 from Britain—funded by private investors—to help meet the demands of the Spanish. The British loan and the amount owed directly to Spain were to be repaid from tariffs collected at Moroccan ports, to be overseen by Spanish agents.

In the late 19th century, Morocco's expenses grew many times greater than its income. In paying war indemnities, buying military equipment, and buying manufactured goods from Europe, more than half of Morocco's revenue went abroad.

== Early 20th century ==
Between 1902 and 1909, Morocco's annual trade deficit reached 14 million Francs.

Sultan Abdelaziz attempted fiscal reform to curb the draining of the treasury by instating a non-Quranic universal capital tax called the tartib (ترتيب). It was applied to everyone—including privileged groups such as the shurafa, tribal qaids, those protected by the protégé system, and Europeans, who were for the first time allowed to purchase property at port cities engaged in overseas trade. Although the tartib tax was first mentioned at the Madrid Conference of 1880, Sultan Hassan I of Morocco never implemented it.

Morocco took on a number of loans from European sources: 7.5 million francs from French banks in 1901, loans from England and Belgium, and 62.5 million francs from France June 1904.

The Treaty of Algeciras of 1906 formalized France's dominant position in Morocco and established the State Bank of Morocco (French: Banque d'État du Maroc) under foreign supervision. The bank essentially took over fiscal administration in Morocco.

== Under the French Protectorate (1912–1956) ==
During the period when Morocco was under a French Protectorate, the economy changed substantially, as the French imposed economic modernization onto Morocco.

=== Agriculture ===
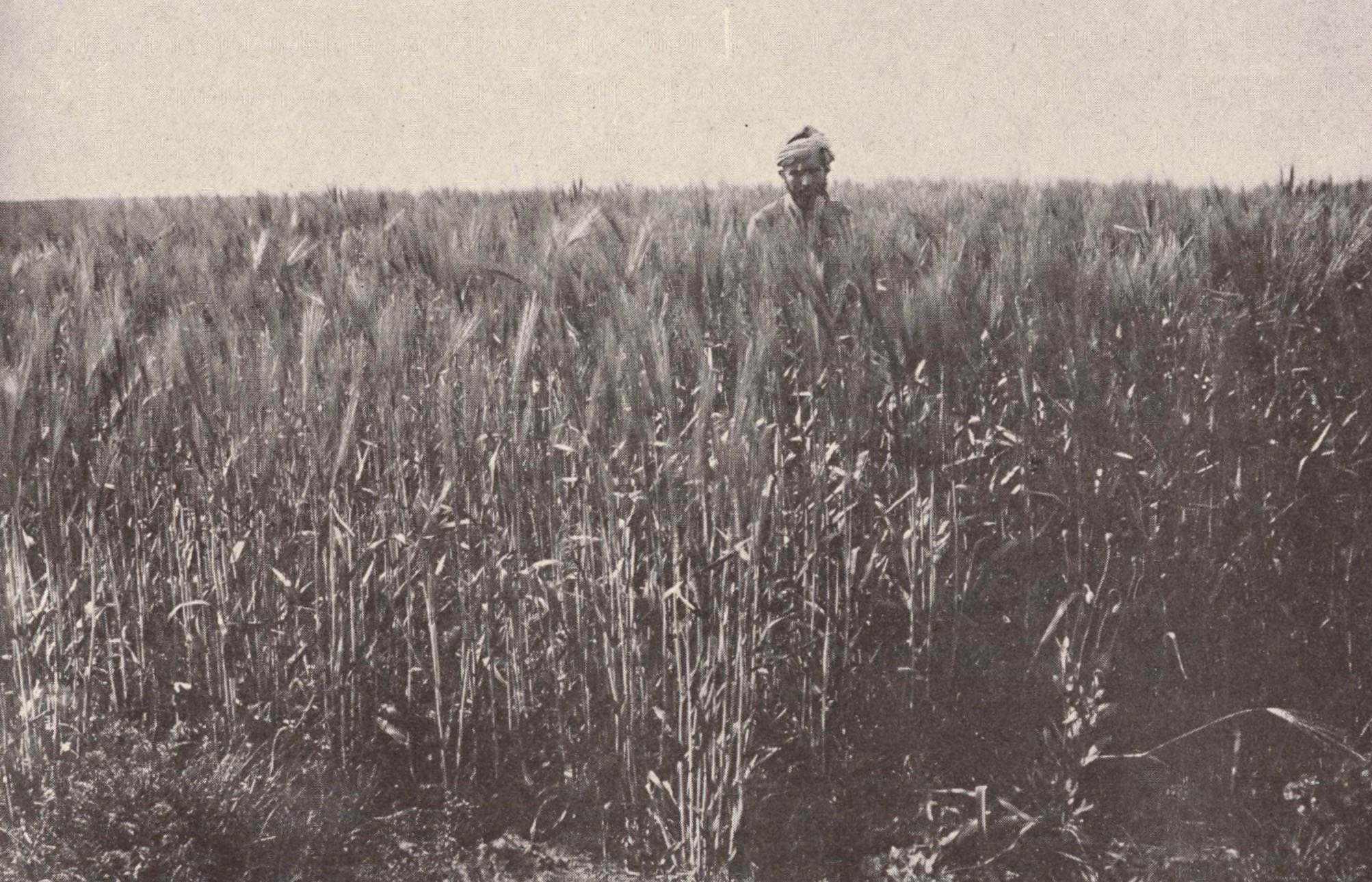
A farmer in a field of barley in the Chaouia, published 15 August 1917 in the magazine France-Maroc

With the objective of securing a steady supply of grain for Metropolitan France and transforming North Africa once again into the "granary of Rome," Lyautey solicited a select group of 692 French "gentlemen-farmers"—instead of what he called the "riff-raff" of southern Europe—to serve as an example to les indigènes and impart French influence in the rural colonization of Morocco from 1917 to 1925. Primarily cereals were planted in the regions of Chaouia, Gharb, and Hawz—despite the fact that the region is prone to drought. After a period of minimal profits and a massive locust swarm in 1930, agricultural production shifted toward irrigated, higher-value crops such as citrus fruits and vegetables. The industrialization of agriculture required capital that many Moroccan farmers didn't have, leading to a rural exodus as many headed to find work in the city.

=== Infrastructure ===
Roadmap of Morocco in 1919

Compagnie franco-espagnole du chemin de fer de Tanger à Fez built a standard gauge railroad connecting Fes and Tangier, while Compagnie des chemins de fer du Maroc (CFM) built standard gauge railways connecting Casablanca, Kenitra, and Sidi Kacem, and Casablanca and Marrakech, completed in 1928. Compagnie des Chemins de Fer du Maroc Oriental created narrow-gauge railroads east of Fes.

La Compagnie de Transports au Maroc (CTM) was founded 30 November 1919 with the goal of accessing "all of Morocco." Its services ran along a new colonial road system planned with the aim of linking all major towns and cities.

=== Natural Resources ===
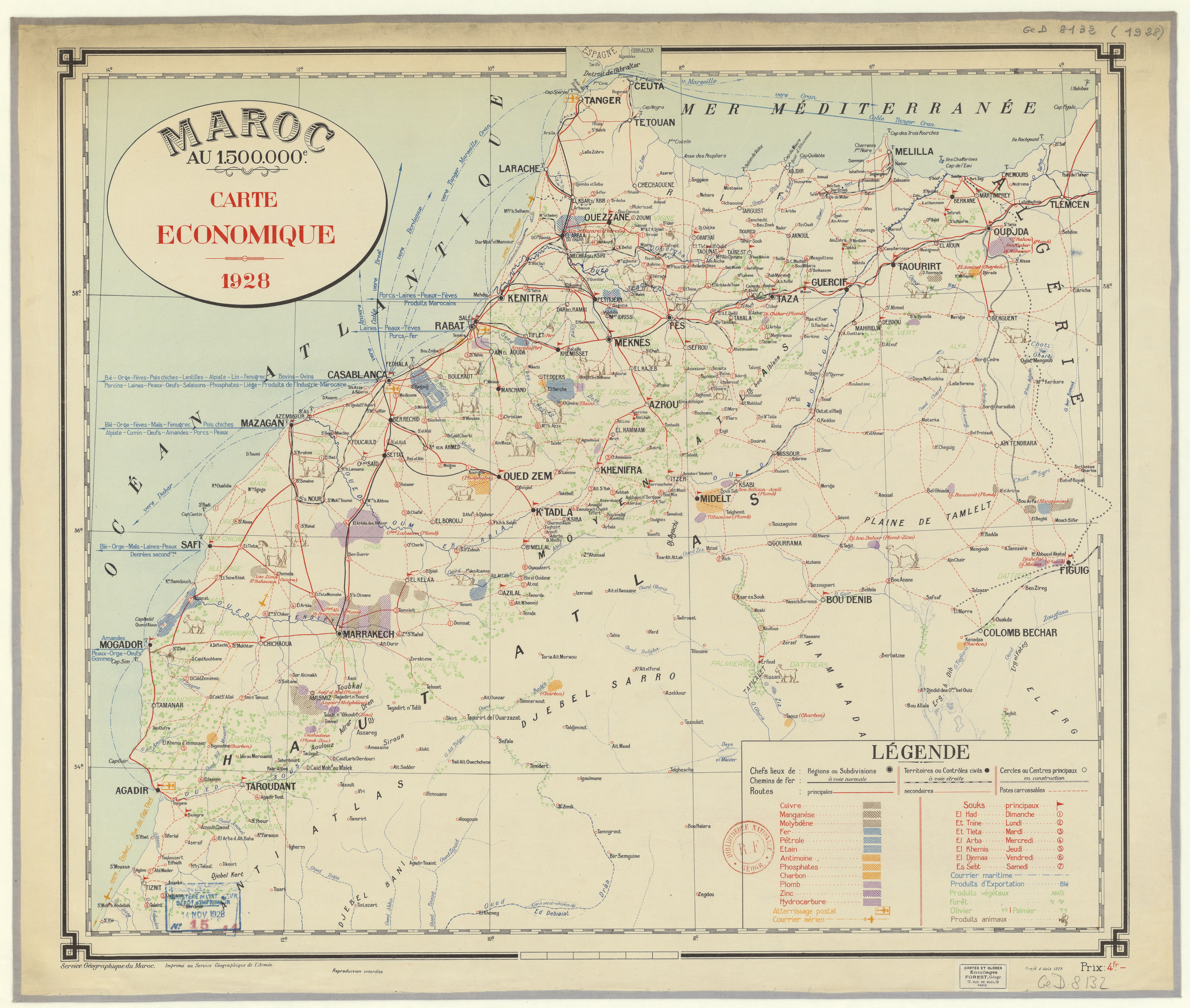
An economic map of Morocco produced by the French protectorate in 1928

The Office Chérifien des Phosphates (OCP) was created in 1920 to mine phosphates out of Khouribga, which was connected to the Port of Casablanca by a direct rail line. In 1921, 39,000 tons of phosphate were extracted, while almost 2 million tons were extracted in 1930. The Moroccan laborers working in the mines benefited from no social protections, were forbidden from unionizing, and earned a tiny fraction of what Europeans earned.

=== Industry ===
Industry during the early period of the protectorate on focused food processing for local consumption: there were canneries, a sugar refinery (Compagnie Sucriere Marocaine, COSUMA), a brewing company (Société des Brasseries du Maroc, SBM), and flourmills. Manufacturing and heavy industry, however, were not embraced for fears of competing with Metropolitan France.

== Before the 1960s ==
In the 20th century a lot of firms in the Arabic world were run by the government. This was due to the objective to mitigate the influence of foreigners and minorities that frequently ran the firms. Other reasons included the lack of human capital as well as the special characteristics of oil production economies. Regarding the human skills Morocco lagged behind; the years of schooling as a representation of the level of human capital did not increase much in Morocco in the beginning of the 20th century (from almost 0 years of schooling in 1880 to around 1.6 in 1950). Even compared to other North African countries Morocco was worse off. So this lack of school education was a difficult barrier for developing a class of entrepreneurs.

== 1960s ==
Morocco instituted a series of development plans to modernize the economy and increase production during the 1960s. Net investment under the five-year plan for 1960 to 1964 was about $1.3 billion. The plan called for a growth rate of 6.2%, but by 1964 the growth rate had only reached 3%. A new three-year plan (1965 to 1967) targeted an annual growth rate of 3.7%. The plan emphasized the development and modernization of Morocco's agricultural sector. The five-year development plan for 1968 to 1972 called for increased agriculture and irrigation. The development of the tourist industry also figured prominently in the plan. The objective was to attain an annual 5% growth rate in GDP; the real growth rate actually exceeded 6%.

== 1970s ==
On March 3, 1973, King Hassan II enacted the domestic economic policy of Moroccanization, in which major segments of the private sector were transferred to Moroccan ownership.

Investment during the 1970s included industry and tourism development. The five-year plan for 1973 to 1977 envisaged a real economic growth of 7.5% annually. Industries singled out for development included chemicals (especially phosphoric acid), phosphate production, paper products, and metal fabrication. Tourist development was also stressed. In 1975, King Hassan II announced a 50% increase in investment targets to allow for the effects of inflation. The 1978 to 1980 plan was one of stabilization and retrenchment, designed to improve Morocco's balance-of payments position, but the 4% annual growth rate achieved was disappointing.

== 1980s ==
The ambitious five-year plan for 1981 to 1985, estimated to cost more than $18 billion, aimed for a growth rate of 6.5% annually. The plan's principal priority was to create some 900,000 new jobs and to train managers and workers in modern agricultural and industrial techniques. Other major goals were to increase production in agriculture and fisheries to make the country self-sufficient in food, and to develop energy (by building more hydroelectric installations and by finding more petroleum and other fossil fuels), industry, and tourism to enable Morocco to lessen its dependence on foreign loans. The plan called for significant expansion of irrigated land, for increased public works projects such as hospitals and schools, and for economic decentralization and regional development through the construction of 25 new industrial parks outside the crowded Casablanca-Kénitra coastal area. Proposed infrastructural improvements included the $2-billion rail line from Marrakech to El Aaiún; a new fishing port at Ad-Dakhla, near Argoub in the Western Sahara; and a bridge-tunnel complex across the Strait of Gibraltar to link Morocco directly with Spain. Large industrial projects included phosphoric acid plants, sugar refineries, mines to exploit cobalt, coal, silver, lead, and copper deposits, and oil-shale development.

== 1990s ==
Moroccan economic policies brought macroeconomic stability to the country in the early 1990s but did not spur enough growth to reduce unemployment despite Moroccan Government's ongoing efforts to diversify the economy.

Since the early 1990s, Morocco has embarked on a major economic restructuring programme aimed at raising living standards, cutting unemployment and boosting growth. In pursuit of these goals, successive governments have made efforts to attract domestic and overseas investment, which has obliged them to tackle a string of other problems - such as reducing red tape and corruption, updating the financial system and privatizing telecommunications, water and power.

Meanwhile, rolling back the state in terms of cutting public expenditure has also been a priority, alongside labour market reform. Both of these have been praised by international bodies such as the IMF and World Bank, but have led to frequent confrontation between the unions and the government, which since 1998 has been centre-left dominated.

The IMF, World Bank and Paris Club backed structural adjustment programmes followed by the administration first seeing dirham convertibility established for current account transactions in 1993. This marked the beginning of a phased restructuring of the financial sector, which from 1994 was joined by a phased liberalisation of basic item imports. In 1995, the investment code was reformed, and in 1996 an Association Accord was signed with the European Union (EU). This came into force in 2000, with the EU long established as the country's main trading partner - taking some 75% of Morocco's exports and providing 60% of its imports. France alone accounts for about a quarter of the country's imports and a third of its exports.

Meanwhile, the privatisation programme gained momentum in 1999 and 2000 with the sale of a 35% stake in Maroc Telecom (MT), the telecommunications provider. Morocco was one of the first Arab countries to begin a programme of state sell offs, and it has one of the most ambitious programmes, with 114 enterprises identified for sale in 1993. However, progress has been slow since then, and the programme stalled again soon after the MT stake sell off. It is now hoped that the sale of a further 16% stake in MT, the state tobacco company, several sugar firms and a clutch of power generation and water management facilities will revitalize the programme.

Drought conditions depressed activity in the key agricultural sector, and contributed to an economic slowdown in 1999. Favourable rainfalls have led Morocco to a growth of 6% for 2000. Formidable long-term challenges included: servicing the external debt; preparing the economy for freer trade with the European Union; and improving education and attracting foreign investment to improve living standards and job prospects for Morocco's youthful population.

== 2000s ==
Macroeconomic indicators
| GDP (PPP) | US $148.1 billion (2009 est.) |
| GDP growth | 5.7% (2009 est.) |
| GDP per capita PPP | US $4,725 (2009 est.) |
| GNI(PPP) per capita | US $3,990 (2009 est.) |
| Inflation (CPI) | 4,6% (2009 est.) |
| Gini index | 40.0 (2005) |
| Unemployment | 2,1% (2008) |
| HDI | ▲0.646 (2007) |
| Labor force | 11.5 million (2008 est.) |
| Pop. in poverty | 15% (2008) |

Macroeconomic stability coupled with relatively slow economic growth characterized the Moroccan economy from 2000 to 2005. The government introduced a number of important economic reforms in that period. The economy, however, remained overly dependent on the agricultural sector. Morocco's primary economic challenge was to accelerate growth in order to reduce high levels of unemployment.

External debt stood at around $19 billion in 2002, but the country had strong foreign exchange reserves and active external debt management, which was allowing it to service its debts. The government continued liberalizing the telecommunications sector in 2002, as well as the rules for oil and gas exploration. This process started with the sale of a second GSM license in 1999. The government in 2003 was using revenue from privatizations to finance increased spending. Although Morocco's economy grew in the early 2000s, it was not enough to significantly reduce poverty.

Through a foreign exchange rate anchor and well-managed monetary policy, Morocco has held inflation rates to industrial country levels over the past decade. Inflation in 2000 and 2001 were below 2%. Despite criticism among exporters that the dirham has become badly overvalued, the current account deficit remains modest. Foreign exchange reserves were strong, with more than $7 billion in reserves at the end of 2001. The combination of strong foreign exchange reserves and active external debt management gives Morocco the capacity to service its debt. Current external debt stands at about $16.6 billion.

Economic growth, however, has been erratic and relatively slow, partially because of an over-reliance on the agricultural sector. Agriculture production is extremely susceptible to rainfall levels and ranges from 13% to 20% of GDP. Given that 36% of Morocco's population depends directly on agriculture production, droughts have a severe knock-on effect to the economy. Two successive years of drought led to a 1% incline in real GDP in 1999 and stagnation in 2000. Better rains during the 2000 to 2001 growing season led to a 6.5% growth rate in 2001. Growth in 2006 exceeded 9% thanks to a booming real-estate market.

The strongest point of Moroccan industry is phosphate mining near Khouribga and in Western Sahara. Morocco has approximately two thirds of the world's phosphate reserves. Phosphate mining companies employ only 2% of the population, but phosphate mining is responsible for half of the nation's income.

The national government introduced a series of structural reforms in the first decade of the 21st century. The most promising reforms have been in the liberalization of the telecommunications sector. In 2001, the process continued with the privatization of 35% of the state operator Maroc Telecom. Morocco has announced plans to sell two fixed licenses in 2002. Morocco also has liberalized rules for oil and gas exploration and has granted concessions for many public services in major cities. The tender process in Morocco is becoming increasingly transparent. Many believe, however, that the process of economic reform must be accelerated in order to reduce urban unemployment below the current rates above 20%.

The United States Senate ratified the U.S.-Morocco Free Trade Agreement Implementation Act by a vote of 85 to 13 on July 21, 2004. Morocco has also signed a free trade agreement with the European Union which is to take effect by 2010.

== Development ==
During the last 30 years, Morocco has embarked on a gradual but solid program of human development and political liberalization. Since the 1970s, gross national income per person more than quadrupled from $550 to $2,770. The average life expectancy has increased from 55 years in 1970 to 72.5 in 2007. During the same period, the average number of births per woman has seen a dramatic decline from 6.3 to 2.3 while the number of children dying before age one has dropped from 115 to 38 (per 100,000 live births). Substantial educational improvements during the past 30 years include a primary school net enrollment increase from 47 to 93.5 percent in 2007/08. Access to safe water is expanding particularly rapidly with quasi-universal access to potable water in urban areas where 83 percent of households are connected to reliable network service and the rest rely on standpipes and vendors.

== See also ==
- Economic history of the Arab world
