= Land reform in Taiwan =

1950s campaign in Nationalist Taiwan

Coordinates: 25.0477°N 121.5493°E

After the Republic of China's central government fled to Taiwan in 1949, the government enacted a series of land reforms on the island throughout the 1950s and 1960s. The reforms occurred in three main successive stages. First, in 1949, farm rents were capped at 37.5% of yields through the 37.5% Arable Rent Reduction Act. Second, starting in 1951, public land was sold to tenant farmers. Third, starting in 1953, large landholdings were broken up and redistributed to tenant farmers in what is dubbed as the "Land to the Tiller" reform.

The Taiwanese government found land reform highly attractive due to the government's ideological origin: the founding father of the Republic of China Sun Yat-sen, who was influenced by Georgism, had proclaimed Equalization of Land Rights to be foundational to his political platform. The course of action was further made attractive by Taiwan's reversion from Japanese rule in 1945: many of the Japanese large landowners had fled, and the non-Japanese large landowners could be compensated with Japanese commercial and industrial properties the government seized. The land program succeeded also because the Kuomintang were mostly from Mainland China and so had few ties to the remaining indigenous landowners. Furthermore, the Kuomintang industrial policy focused on cooperating with Taiwan's large landowners who had previously collaborated with Japanese rule, since their shared anti-communism permitted the Taiwanese landowners to switch allegiances quickly. The success of the reforms was also highly dependent on the Sino-American Joint Commission on Rural Reconstruction or JCRR, an organization created by the U.S.'s China Aid Act of 1948. The JCRR channeled a vast amount of American aid into agriculture, coordinated with the Taiwan government to pass land reform acts, and designated programs that contributed directly to agriculture.

The Taiwanese land reform is largely considered to be successful; it yielded strong results in the improvement of life quality in rural Taiwan and facilitated Taiwan's transition from sharecropping based agriculture to landowner-farmer based agriculture.

In 1947, 16.5 percent of Taiwan's farm households fully owned the land they farmed, according to economist Anthony Y. C. Koo, and by 1965 that share had risen to 69.5 percent, more than four times the 1947 figure. Over those same 18 years, the share of farm households that Koo classified as pure tenants went from 42.1 percent in 1947 to 7.0 percent in 1965, meaning that by 1965 fewer than one in ten were pure tenants. Tchin-Ching Liu's figures show that the share of owner-cultivators rose from 38 percent in 1952 to 55 percent in 1953, the year Taiwan passed the Land-to-the-Tiller law. By 1965, the share of owner-cultivators in Liu's figures had reached 67 percent, or about two-thirds. Liu's figures also show that the share of tenant farmers fell from 36 percent in 1952 to 21 percent in 1953, a decline of 15 percentage points in one year.

== See also ==
- Economic history of Taiwan
- Land Reform Movement – counterpart policy in Mainland China
- Land Bank of Taiwan
- Land Reform Museum
