= Economic history of China =

The economic history of China is covered in the following articles:

- Economic history of China before 1912, the economic history of China during the ancient China and imperial China, before the establishment of the Republic of China in 1912.
  - Economy of the Han dynasty (202 BC – AD 220)
  - Economy of the Song dynasty (960–1279)
  - Economy of the Ming dynasty (1368–1644)
  - Economy of the Qing dynasty (1644–1912)
- Economic history of China (1912–1949), the economic history of the Republic of China during the period when it controlled mainland China from 1912 to 1949.
  For the economic history of the Republic of China during the period when it only controls Taiwan area after 1949, see Economic history of Taiwan#Modern history.
- Economic history of China (1949–present), the economic history of the People's Republic of China.

== See also ==
- Economy of China
- Economic history of the Republic of China
- Bibliographies of the People's Republic of China
