= 2000s in Morocco =

In March 2000, women's groups organised demonstrations in Casablanca proposing reforms to the legal status of women in the country. 40,000 women attended, calling for a ban on polygamy and the introduction of civil divorce law (divorce being a purely religious procedure at that time). Although a counter-demonstration attracted half a million participants, the movement for change started in 2000 was influential on King Mohammed, and he enacted a new Mudawana, or family law, in early 2004, meeting some of the demands of women's rights activists.

In July 2002, a crisis broke with Spain over an uninhabited small island lying just less than 200 meters from the Moroccan coast, named Toura (Arabic) or Leila (Berber) by Moroccans, and Isla Perejil by Spain. After mediation by the United States, Both Morocco and Spain agreed to return to the status quo by which the Island remains deserted and almost a no man's land.

In September 2002, new legislative elections were held, and the Socialist Union of Popular Forces (Union Socialiste des Forces Populaires—USFP) led all other parties in the voting. International observers regarded the elections as free and fair, noting the lack of irregularities that had plagued the 1997 elections. Under Muhammad VI, Morocco has continued down a path toward economic, political, and social reform and modernization. In May 2003, in honor of the birth of a son and heir to the throne, the king ordered the release of 9,000 prisoners and the reduction of 38,000 sentences. Also in 2003, Berber-language instruction was introduced in primary schools, prior to introducing it at all educational levels. In 2004, the government implemented reforms of the family code improving the status of women—first proposed in 2000—despite the objections of traditionalists.

Internationally, Morocco has maintained a moderate stance, with strong ties to the West. It was one of the first Arab and Islamic states to denounce the 9/11 terrorist attacks on the United States. In May 2003, Morocco itself was subjected to the more radical forces at work in the Arab world when Islamist suicide bombers simultaneously struck a series of sites in Casablanca, killing 45 and injuring more than 100 others. The Moroccan government responded with a crackdown against Islamist extremists, ultimately arresting several thousand, prosecuting 1,200, and sentencing about 900. Additional arrests followed in June 2004. That same month, the United States designated Morocco a major non-North Atlantic Treaty Organization ally in recognition of its efforts to thwart international terrorism. On 1 January 2006, a comprehensive bilateral free trade agreement between the United States and Morocco took effect. The agreement had been signed in 2004 along with a similar agreement with the European Union, its main trade partner.

In 2005, demonstrations and riots in support of independence for Western Sahara broke out in Moroccan-controlled El-Aaiun. Criticism from groups such as Amnesty International, Freedom House and Human Rights Watch has resulted from perceived police abuse of demonstrators and independence advocates. The demonstrations are labeled the "Independence Intifada" by its participants and are supported by the Polisario Front. Sporadic unrest is still occurring in January 2007.
