= 37.5% Arable Rent Reduction Act =

Legislative Yuan
- Territorial extent: Republic of China (Taiwan)
- Enacted: 25 May 1951
- Commenced: 9 June 1951

Amended by
- December 9, 1954: Amended by the President; December 23, 1983: Amended and enforced by Order Tai-Tong(1)-yi No.7090 of the President; May 15, 2002: Article 3, 4, 6 amended by Order Hua-Zong(1)-yi No. 09100095610 of the President
- Status: In force

The 37.5% Arable Rent Reduction Act (Chinese: 耕地三七五減租條例; pinyin: Gēngdì Sānqīwǔ Jiǎnzū Tiáolì) is a law enacted by the Republic of China (Taiwan) on 25 May 1951. The act was proposed by Jiang Menglin of the JCRR on Apr 14 1949 to Chen Cheng, the Provincial Governor of Taiwan. The act was eventually passed by the Legislative Yuan on 25 May 1951.

The act is among a series of land reform policies enacted by Republic of China aimed at reducing poverty among tenant farmers. Prior to the Taiwanese land reformation, huge wealth disparities existed in rural Taiwan, with rich land-owners collecting hefty rents from tenant farmers; these rents on average amounted to around 50% of crop yield. The 37.5% Arable Rent Reduction Act capped the maximum arable land rent to 37.5% of crop yield. Aside from that, the act provided further protection to farmers, such as pardoning all rent during natural disasters, promoting farmer's associations, and limiting landlords' ability to evict tenants as they please.

The 37.5% Arable Rent Reduction Act and associating land reformation policy stems from Republic of China's official ideology of Three Principles of the People, which includes Georgist doctrine of Equalization of Land Rights. The policy yielded strong results in the improvement of life quality in rural Taiwan and facilitated Taiwan's transition from sharecropping based agriculture to landowner-farmer based agriculture.
