= Economic history of Taiwan =

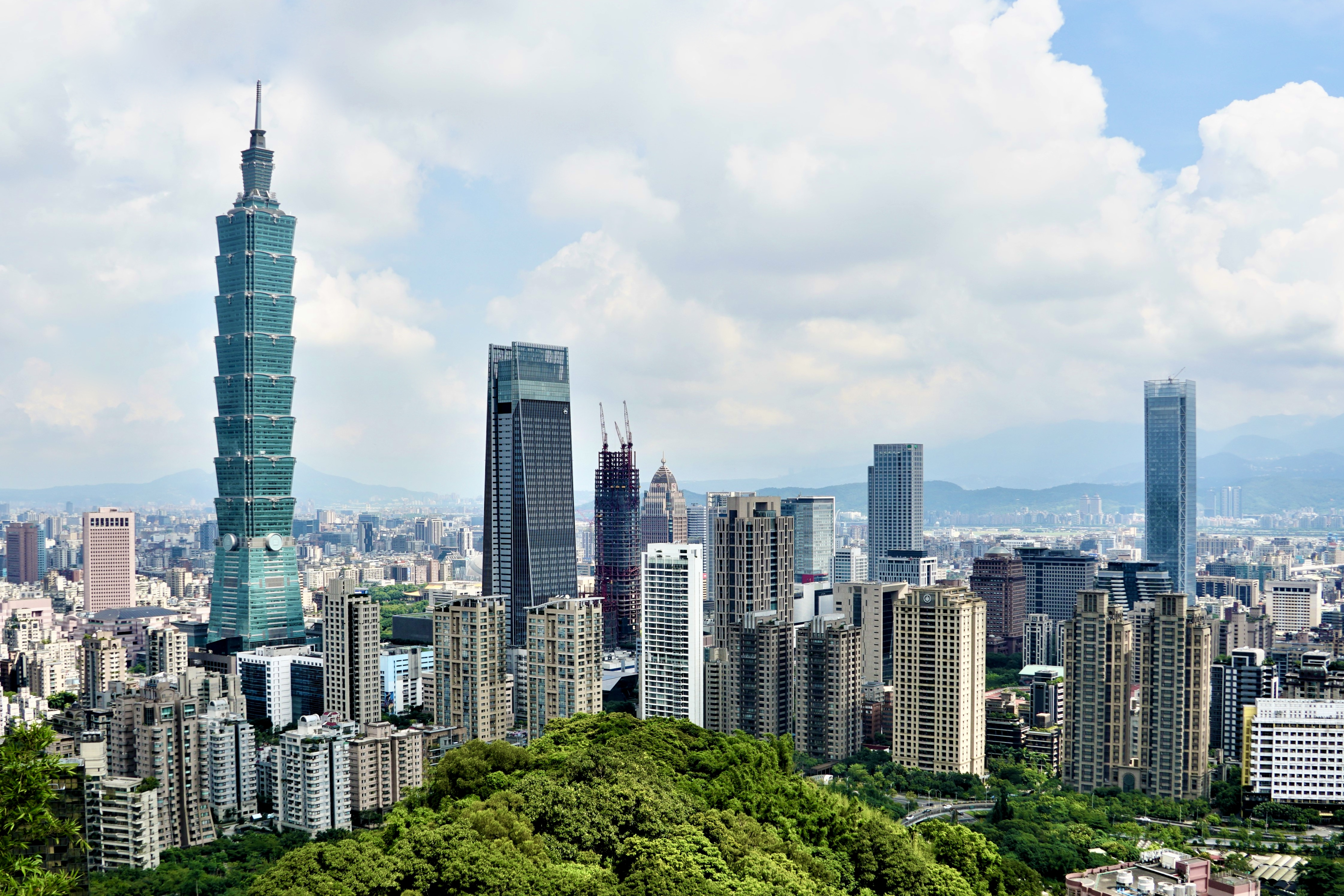
Taipei, the capital city and financial centre of Taiwan

GDP per capita development in Taiwan.

The recordkeeping and development of the economic history of Taiwan started in the Age of Discovery. In the 17th century, the Europeans realized that Taiwan is located on the strategic cusp between the Far East and Southeast Asia. Two main European empires that competed to colonize it were the Dutch and Spanish Empires. Taiwan also became an intermediate destination for trade between Western European empires and East Asia states. The history of Taiwan as a colony of the Dutch Empire, Kingdom of Tungning, Qing China, and Empire of Japan between 1630 and 1945 was based heavily on economics.

In the 1950s, the ROC government, retreated to Taiwan after losing the Chinese Civil War, carried out land reform policies such as the 37.5% Arable Rent Reduction Act. In the 1960s, the agrarian economy was replaced with light industry as small and medium enterprises started to form. From 1966 to 1980, Taiwan's economy was gradually stabilized as the Ten Major Construction Projects laid a foundation in further economic developments. After the 1980s, the role of government in the economy gradually lessened as many government-owned corporations were privatized.

== Prehistory ==
According to archaeological evidences, Taiwan has been inhabited by human since the late Upper Paleolithic (ca. 50,000 - 10,000 BP). One of the first civilizations developed was the Changpin culture (Chinese: 長濱文化) in southern Taiwan. Many archaeological sites of Neolithic civilizations were found in the Taipei basin in northern Taiwan. The economic activities during this period, which cannot be described with detail as there was no written language, were fishing, gathering, and farming.

Analysis of spores and pollen grains in sediment of Sun Moon Lake suggests that traces of slash-and-burn agriculture started in the area since 11,000 years ago, and ended 4,200 years ago, when abundant remains of rice cultivation were found in such period.

In the early Neolithic period, jade was used only for tools such are adzes, axes and spear points. From about 2500 BC, jade ornaments began to be produced, peaking in sophistication between 1500 BC and 1 AD, particularly in the Beinan Culture of southern Taiwan. All the jade found on Taiwan came from a deposit of green nephrite at Fengtian, near modern Hualien City. Nephrite from Taiwan began to appear in the northern Philippines between 1850 and 1350 BC, spawning the Philippine jade culture. Around the beginning of the Common Era, artisans in Taiwan switched from jade to metal, glass and carnelian. However, Philippine craftsmen continued to work jade from Taiwan until around 1000 AD, producing lingling-o pendants and other ornaments, which have been found throughout southeast Asia.

Artifacts of iron and other metals appeared on Taiwan around the beginning of the Common Era. At first these were trade goods, but by around 400 AD wrought iron was being produced locally using bloomeries, a technology possibly introduced from the Philippines. Distinct Iron Age cultures have been identified in different parts of the island: the Shihsanhang Culture (十三行文化) in the north, the Fanzaiyuan Culture (番仔園) in the northwest, the Daqiuyuan Culture (大邱園) in the hills of southwest Nantou County, the Kanding Culture in the central west, the Niaosung Culture in the southwest, the Guishan Culture (龜山) at the southern tip of the island, and the Jingpu Culture (靜浦) on the east coast. The earliest trade goods from China found on the island date from the Tang dynasty (618–907 AD).

== Contacts with Europe ==
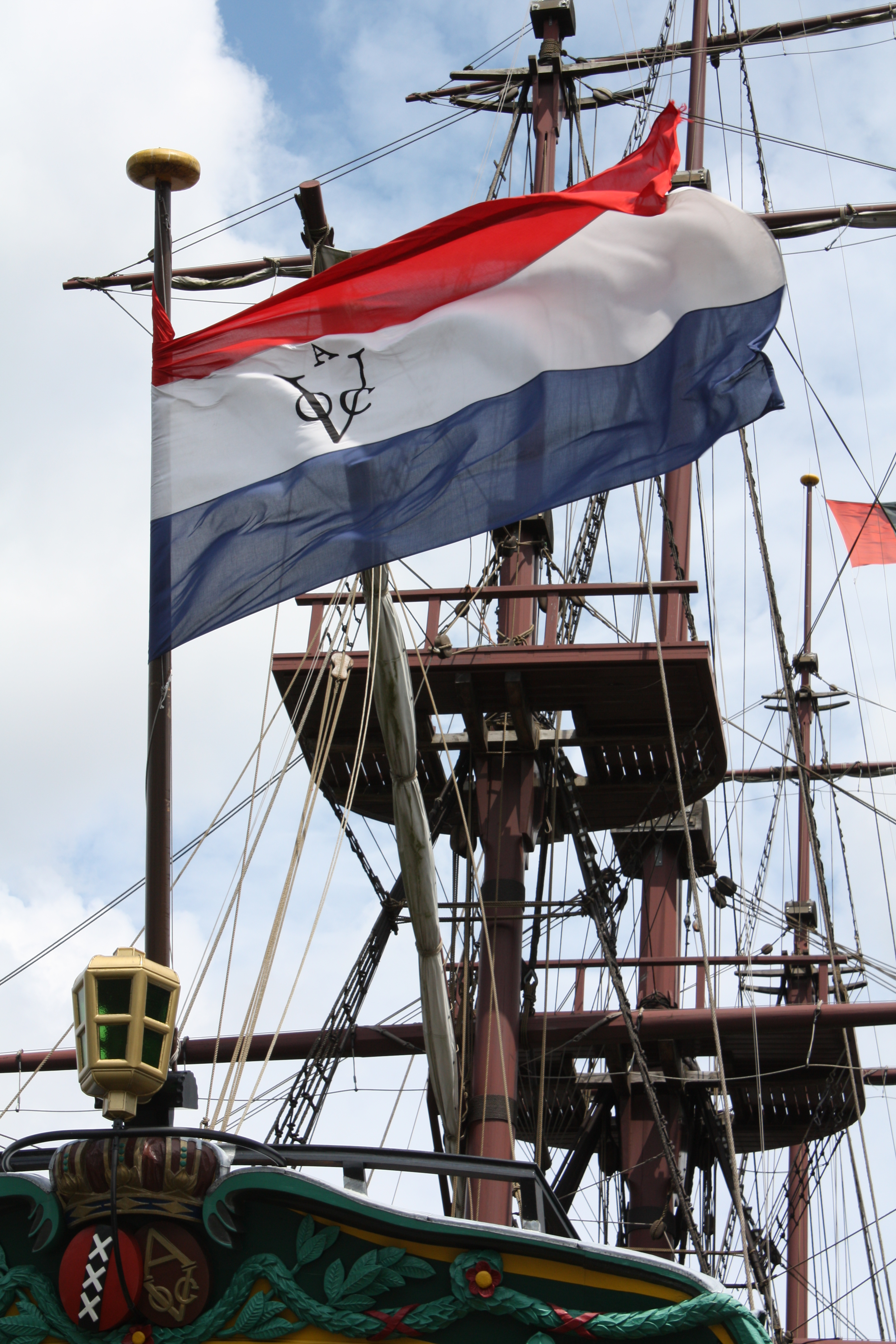
Replica of an East Indiaman of the Dutch East India Company/United East India Company (VOC).

In the early 17th century, the Dutch East India Company originally only traded along the Pescadores. However, the Ming Dynasty claimed the archipelago to be part of its territory and drove out the Dutch. The Dutch were forced to retreat to the main island of Taiwan, then known as Formosa. They established a trading post in Tayoan (modern-day Tainan City).

The Dutch recognized the significance of cane sugar as an export product and extensively developed the industry in the areas under their control. Dutch exports of sugar rose rapidly throughout their colonial tenure and had reached 1,300 tons by 1660, a tenfold increase from 1636.

The main purpose of the occupation of Taiwan was to trade with mainland China, Japan, Korea, and Southeast Asia, attempting to monopolize on the trade in East Asia. The main Taiwanese resources that they exported were sugar, sika deerskin, deer meat, antlers, rattan, and rice. By 1658, the company exported sugar to Persia, Japan, and Jakarta and had about 35 trading posts in Asia. Tayoan gained 25.6% profit, ranked second out of all of the Dutch trading posts, after Nagasaki, Japan. However, the profit was distributed to shareholders of the company, and not the local Taiwanese.

At the time, the Japanese were also interested in commercial activities in Taiwan. As a result of the economic challenge from the Japanese, the Dutch East India Company levied heavy taxes on the Japanese merchants. In 1628, the Japanese kidnapped governor Pieter Nuyts and closed down the trading post in Nagasaki. It was reopened again in 1632, after Nuyts was extradited to be jailed in Japan.

== Early Chinese administration ==
Amid the conquest of the Qing dynasty, the Ming partisan Koxinga invaded Dutch Formosa to use as a base for assaults along China's coast. After his successful siege of Ft Zeelandia, he had accomplished this but his rule caused the Qing to revive the sea bans and cut off maritime trade in a bid to weaken him. His dynasty ruled Taiwan as the independent Kingdom of Tungning, establishing land distribution systems in order to efficiently supply food for their army. British Empire and Japan continued to trade with Taiwan as an independent state. The English East India Company even established a commercial treaty with the Kingdom of Tungning.

After defeating Koxinga's private army, the Qing dynasty had no interest in improving the economy of Taiwan, calling it an uncivilized land (huawai zhi di). Therefore, the economic activities mostly came from the settlements of migrants. The most significant economic development during this time period was the establishment of irrigation systems and hydraulic engineering projects. The agricultural surplus caused by these improvements led to the export of rice to mainland China. On the other hand, the commercial activities continued throughout major trading ports. Tainan, Lukang, and Banka became the three largest cities in Taiwan.

In 1858, four ports were opened in Anping, Ta-kau, Keelung, and Tamsui as a result of pressures from the British and French Empires after the Second Opium War. These trading ports exported Taiwanese tea and camphor and further boosted the economy of Taiwan.

== Japanese administration ==
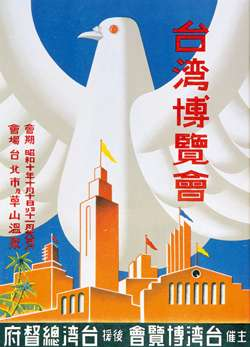
A poster for the 1935 Taiwan Exposition

For the most part, Taiwan's economy during the Japanese rule period was a colonial economy. For example, the human and natural resources of Taiwan were used to aid both the economic and military development of Japan. This policy began under Governor-General Kodama Gentarō and reached its peak in 1943, in the middle of World War II. Before the 1920s, the sugar industry dominated Taiwan's economy, while from 1920 to 1930, rice became the primary export. During these two periods, the primary economic policy of the Office of the Governor-General (OGG) was "industry for Japan, agriculture for Taiwan". After 1930, due to war needs the OGG began to pursue a policy of industrialization.

Under Governor Akashi Motojiro, a vast swamp in central Taiwan was transformed into a huge dam in order to build a hydraulic power plant for industrialization. The dam and its surrounding area, known today as Sun Moon Lake, has become a must-see for foreign tourists visiting Taiwan.

Although the main focus of each of these periods differed, the primary goal throughout the entire time was increasing Taiwan's productivity to satisfy demand within Japan, a goal which was successfully achieved. As part of this process, new ideas, concepts, and values were introduced to the Taiwanese; also, several public works projects, such as railways, public education, and telecommunications, were implemented. As the economy grew, society stabilized, and popular support for the colonial government began to increase. Taiwan thus served as a showcase for Japan's propaganda on the colonial efforts throughout Asia, as displayed during the 1935 Taiwan Exposition.

== Modern history ==
After the Kuomintang retreat to Taiwan, the Taiwanese society was relatively stable politically in the 1950s. However, it faced some obstacles economically as a result of the mass destruction during World War II and the Chinese hyperinflation in the 1940s. The sudden increase in population caused by the Kuomintang migration from mainland China also affected Taiwan's economy.

Facing the economic pressure, the Kuomintang regime established several economic plans and policies. Of primary importance for the long-run growth of this economy was the commitment to education, beginning with universal elementary education, expanded to upper level schooling as basic levels of literacy were attained. The New Taiwan dollars were issued to replace the Old Taiwan dollars. Successful land reform also took place, enabled by the KMT's position as recent immigrants, not established landowners. In addition, the United States aid also helped the reformation of Taiwan's economy.

In the early 1950s, agriculture was the largest economic sector and the vast majority of Taiwanese were farmers.

The government also carried out an import substitution policy, taking what was obtained by agriculture to give support to the industrial sector, trading agricultural product exports for foreign currency to import industrial machinery, thus developing the industrial sector. The government raised tariffs, controlled foreign exchange and restricted imports in order to protect domestic industry. By the 1960s, Taiwan's import exchange industry was faced with the problem of saturating the domestic market. At the same time, the factories of some industrialized nations, because of rising wages and other reasons, slowly moved to certain areas that had both basic industry and low labor costs. By slow steps, the economic policy of Taiwan changed to pursue export expansion under advice of academic economists such as Ta-Chung Liu and Sho-Chieh Tsiang of Cornell University. They also promoted allowing interest rates to rise, to encourage domestic savings and expand the amount of resources available to fund new businesses. Additional academic advisers also members of Academic Sinica provided sound advice encouraging innovation in agricultural techniques, enabling one of the few successful takeoffs toward modern growth based on agricultural investment in cash crops for export.

A major turning point in Taiwan's economy was during the 1970s. The expulsion of the Republic of China (Taiwan) from the United Nations in 1971, the 1973 oil crisis, and the switching of American diplomatic relations heavily affected the economy of Taiwan. But executive premier Chiang Ching-kuo's Ten Major Construction Projects served as the basis for heavy industrial development in Taiwan.

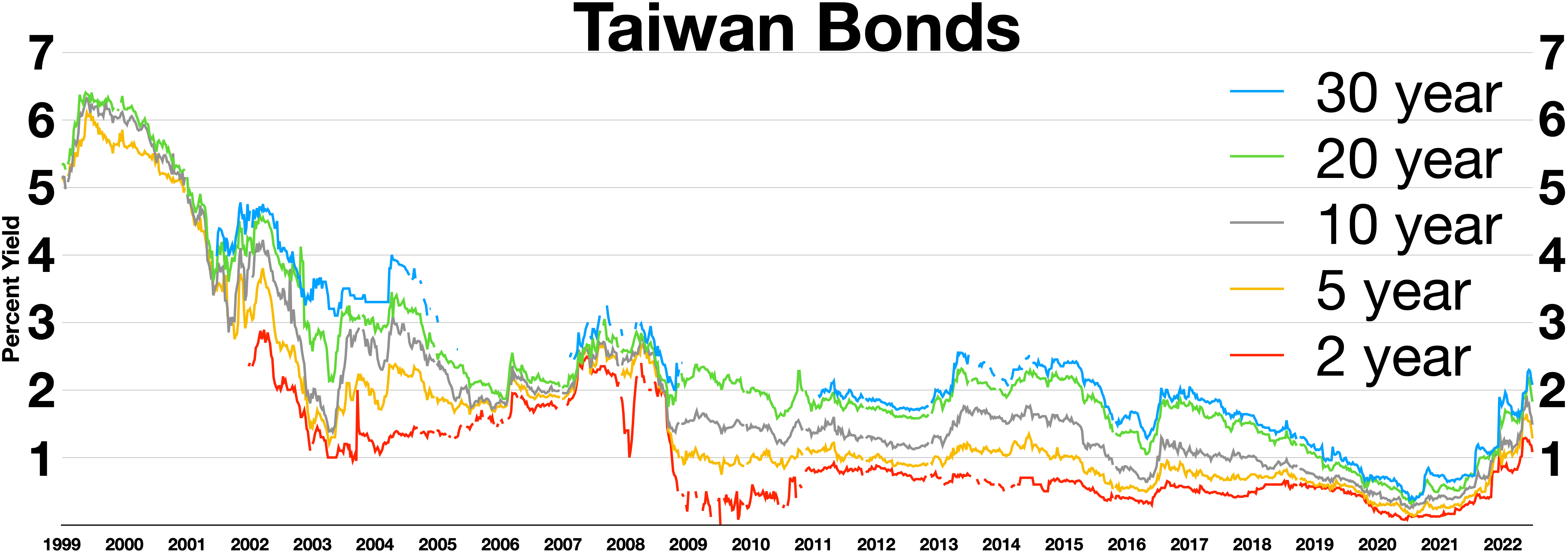
Taiwan bonds No Inverted yield curves 30 year 20 year 10 year 5 year 2 year

After the 1980s, Taiwan's economy began to stabilize. It eventually became one of the Four Asian Tigers as a dynamic capitalist economy. The 1997 Asian financial crisis did not affect Taiwan nearly as harshly due to greater restrictions on the outflow of invested foreign capital than were in place in countries hurt by rapid capital flight. The Chen Shui-bian administration in the 2000s focused on joining international organizations. Taiwan was able to join the World Trade Organization in 2002.

== See also ==
- Economic history
- Economy of Taiwan
- History of Taiwan
