= Economic history of China (1912–1949) =

GDP per capita in China (1913–1950)

After the fall of the Qing dynasty in 1912, China underwent a period of instability and disrupted economic activity. During the Nanjing decade (1927–1937), China advanced in a number of industrial sectors, in particular those related to the military, in an effort to catch up with the west and prepare for war with Japan. The Second Sino-Japanese War (1937–1945) and the following Chinese Civil War caused the retreat of the Republic of China and formation of the People's Republic of China.

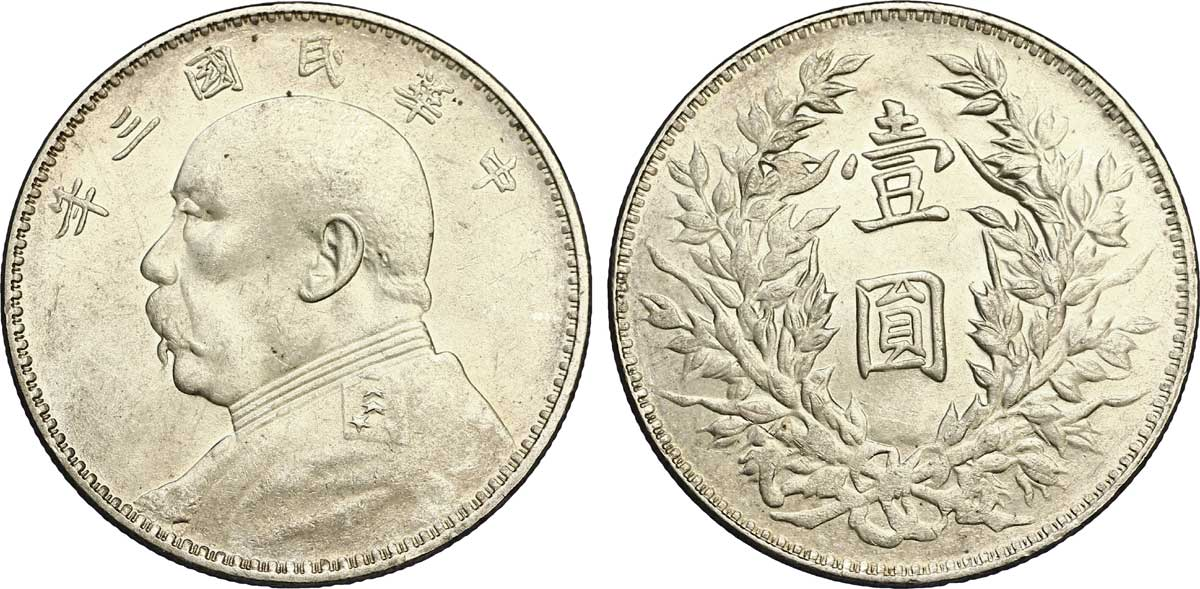
The Yuan Shikai "dollar" (yuan in Chinese), issued for the first time in 1914, became a dominant coin type of the Republic of China.

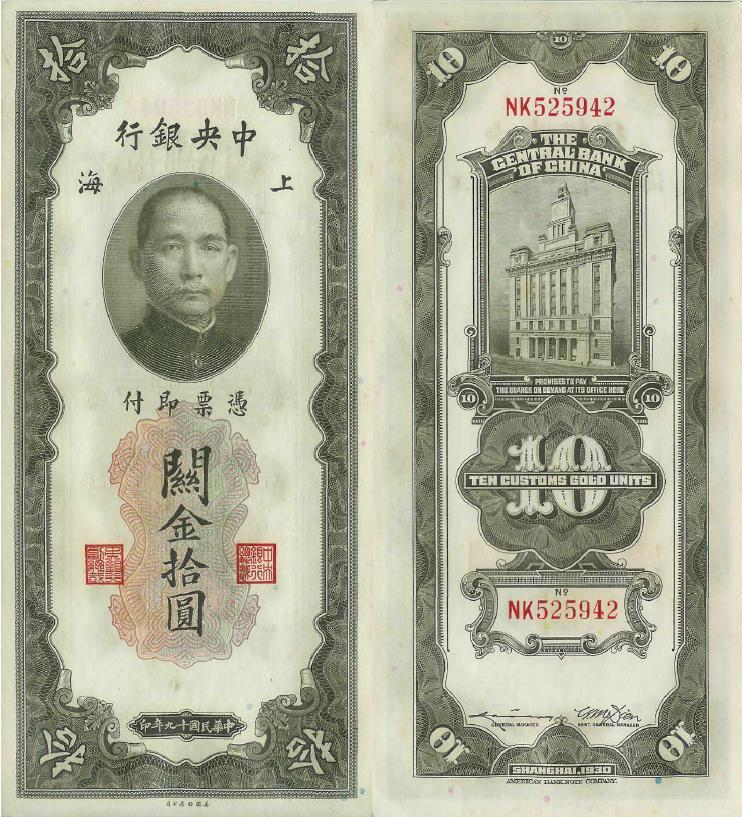
A bill from 1930, early ROC

The Republican era was a period of turmoil. From 1913 to 1927, China disintegrated into regional warlords, fighting for authority, causing misery and disrupting growth. After 1927, Chiang Kai-shek managed to reunify China. The Nanjing decade was a period of relative prosperity despite civil war and Japanese aggression. The government began to stabilize tax collection, establish a national budget, sponsor the construction of infrastructure such as communications and railroads, and draw up ambitious national plans, some of which were implemented after 1949. In 1937, the Japanese invaded and laid China to waste in eight years of war. The era also saw boycott of Japanese products. After 1945, the Chinese Civil War further devastated China and led to the withdrawal of the Nationalist government to Taiwan in 1949.

== Civil war, famine and turmoil in the early republic ==
After the collapse of the Qing Dynasty during the 1911 Revolution, efforts to establish a republic failed. Military strongmen and landlords became the effective rulers in most parts of China. The Warlord era of 1916–1927 was a period of major economic distress for Chinese peasants.

The collapse of central authority caused the economic contraction that was in place during final Qing decades to speed up, and was only reversed after China reunified in 1927 under the rule of Nationalist Generalissimo Chiang Kai-shek.

== Development of domesticated industries ==
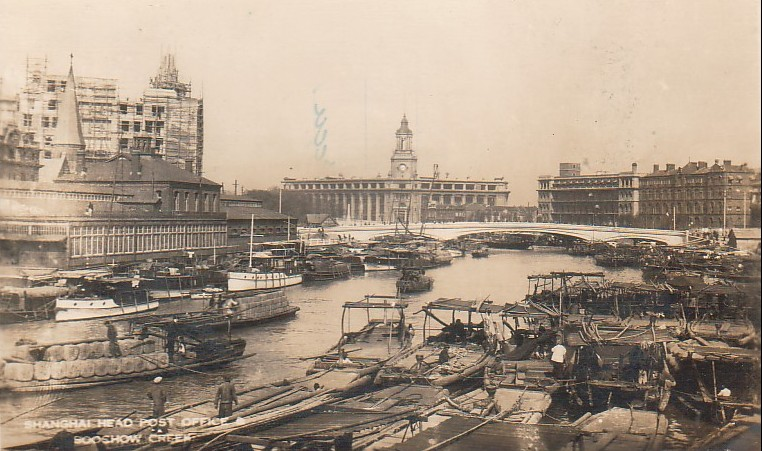
Boat traffic and development along Suzhou Creek, Shanghai, around 1920

Chinese domestic industries developed rapidly after the downfall of the Qing dynasty, despite turmoil in Chinese politics. Substantial modern industrialization did not occur until World War I, which saw a great increase in demand for Chinese goods, which benefitted China's industries. In addition, imports to China grew drastically after total war broke out in Europe. For example, China's textile industry had 482,192 needle machines in 1913, while by 1918 (the end of the war) that number had gone up to 647,570. The number increased even faster to 1,248,282 by 1921. In addition, bread factories went up from 57 to 131.

The May 4th movement, in which Chinese students called on China's population to reject purchasing products not made in China, in other words, boycotting foreign goods, also helped spur development. Foreign imports fell drastically from 1919 to 1921 and from 1925 to 1927.

Despite the outbreak of the Great Depression in 1929, Chinese industry continued to grow and develop into the 1930s. This era is now known as the Nanking decade, a time period seen as commencing when the KMT under Chiang Kai-shek re-unified most of China, bringing a level of political stability not seen in decades. Under Chiang Kai-shek's Nanking based government, China's economy enjoyed unprecedented growth from 1927 to 1931. By 1931 however, the effects of the Great Depression began to badly impact the Chinese economy, a problem compounded further by Japan's invasion and occupation of Manchuria in the same year. Consequently, China's overall GDP, dropped to 28.8 billion in 1932. A period of stagnation and decline followed with GDP falling to 21.3 billion by 1934, after which prosperity began to return with GDP rising to 23.7 billion in 1935 as Chinese industrial output commenced a rapid recovery surpassing 1931 levels by 1936.

Due to China's semicolonial status, in the pre-war period foreigners benefitted from extraterritoriality and foreign companies dominated the country's treaty ports.

== The rural economy of the Republic of China ==
The rural economy retained much of the characteristics of the Late Qing. While markets had been forming since the Song and Ming dynasties, by the Republic era, Chinese agriculture was in largely geared towards producing cash crops for foreign consumption, leaving it vulnerable to the say of international markets. Key exports included glue, tea, silk, sugar cane, tobacco, cotton, corn and peanuts.

The rural economy was hit much harder by the Great Depression, when domestic overproduction of agricultural goods as well as an increase in foreign imports (as agricultural goods produced in western countries were "dumped" in China) led to a collapse in food prices. In 1931, imports of rice in China amounted to 21 million bushels compared with 12 million in 1928. Other goods saw even more staggering increases. In 1932, 15 million bushels of grain were imported compared with 900,000 in 1928. This increased competition caused massive declines in Chinese agricultural prices (which were cheaper) and thus the income of rural farmers. In 1932, agricultural prices were 41 percent of 1921 levels. In some rural areas, incomes had fallen to 57 percent of 1931 levels by 1934.

== Communist areas ==
In 1931, the Communist Party consolidated a number of base areas into a state, the Chinese Soviet Republic. The CSR had a central government as well as local and regional governments and issued currency. The CSR was funded primarily by tax income on grain and rice. It also received voluntary contributions from its core political constituency, the peasantry. During the period 1931 to 1934, the CSR issued three series of government bonds to further finance its operations.

The Communist Party undertook a radical program of land redistribution which destroyed the landlord-dominated political economy which had previously existed within the areas the CSR governed. It issued the 1931 Land Law of the Chinese Soviet Republic, which required:

All lands belonging feudal landlords, local bullies and evil gentry, warlords, bureaucrats, and other large private landlords, irrespective of whether they work the lands themselves or rent them out, shall be confiscated without compensation. The confiscated lands shall be redistributed to the poor and middle peasants through the [CSR]. The former owners of the confiscated lands shall not be entitled to receive any land allotments.

The property of rich peasants was also confiscated, although rich peasants were entitled to receive land of lesser quality if they farmed it themselves. By 1932, the Communist Party had equalized landholding and eliminated debt within the CSR. Although the 1931 Land Law remained the official policy in the CSR's territory until the Nationalists' defeat of the CSR in 1934, after 1932, the Communist Party was more radical in its class analysis, resulting in formerly middle peasants being viewed as rich peasants.

== Foreign direct investment in the Republic of China ==
Foreign direct investment in China soared during the Republic's early years. Some 1.5 billion of investment was present in China by the beginning of the 20th century, with Russia, the United Kingdom and Germany being the largest investors. However, with the outbreak of World War I, investment from Germany and Russia stopped while the UK and Japan took a leading role. By 1930, foreign investment in China was more than 3.5 billion, with Japan leading (1.4 billion) and England at 1 billion. By 1948, however, the capital stock had halted with investment dropping to only 3 billion, with the US and Britain's leading.

== Currency of the Republic of China ==
During most the Nanjing decade, China's currency was on the silver standard. It was necessary for the Nationalist government's expenses to be balanced by sales of government bonds, tax revenues, and other receipts.

In 1935, the Nationalist government issued a new fiat currency, the fabi, through the four government banks (the Central Bank of China, the Bank of China, the Bank of Communications, and the Agricultural Bank).

Particular effort was made by the ROC government to instill the fabi as the monopoly currency of China, stamping out earlier Silver and gold-backed notes that had made up China's currency. No separate institution existed to control the money supply, and therefore the political leadership of the Nationalist government was free to dictate the money supply. The ROC government used this privilege to issue currency en masse; a total of 1.4 billion Chinese yuan was issued in 1936, but by the end of the second Sino-Japanese war some 1.031 trillion in notes had been issued. When it came to military expenses, Chiang Kai-shek decided how much money he needed and ordered H.H. Kung to supply it. This trend worsened with the resumption of the Chinese Civil war in 1946. By 1947, some 33.2 trillion of currency was issued. This was done in large part as an attempt to close the massive budget deficits brought about by the war (taxation revenue was just 0.25 billion, compared with 2500 billion in war expenses). By 1949, the total currency in circulation was 120 billion times more than in 1936.

In the period immediately following the Japanese surrender in the Second Sino-Japanese War, the formerly occupied areas had competing currencies. Japan had never unified the currency systems in the areas it occupied, thus the Wang Jingwei regime, the Wang Kemin regime, and the Manchukuo puppet state all had separate currency systems. The Nationalist government attempted to replace these currencies with the fabi. For the currency of the Wang Jingwei regime, the Nationalist government set a minimal exchange rate of 200 yuan in regime currency to one fabi and required the regime currency to be exchanged within four months. This undervaluation made inflation worse as Chinese who formerly lived under the regime rushed to hoard goods rather than exchange for fabi which in turn drove price increases. Ultimately, the unrealistic exchange rate impoverished those who had lived under the Wang Jingwei regime and made economic revival of the area more difficult. The Nationalist government set more realistic exchange rates for the Wang Kemin and Manchukuo regime currencies.

In response to hyperinflation, the Nationalist government issued the gold yuan in August 1948. Despite the implication of "gold" yuan, the currency was not backed by gold. The gold yuan's value fell with greater speed than the fabi had as the money supply continued growing. The gold yuan regulations had required citizens to surrender their gold and silver. When these regulations were abandoned, people who had complied with the regulations suffered huge losses while those who had violated the regulations and hoarded gold and silver avoided this harm. As hyperinflation continued after the gold yuan's failure, Chinese increasingly avoided currency and increasingly exchanged goods via barter.

== The Chinese war economy ==
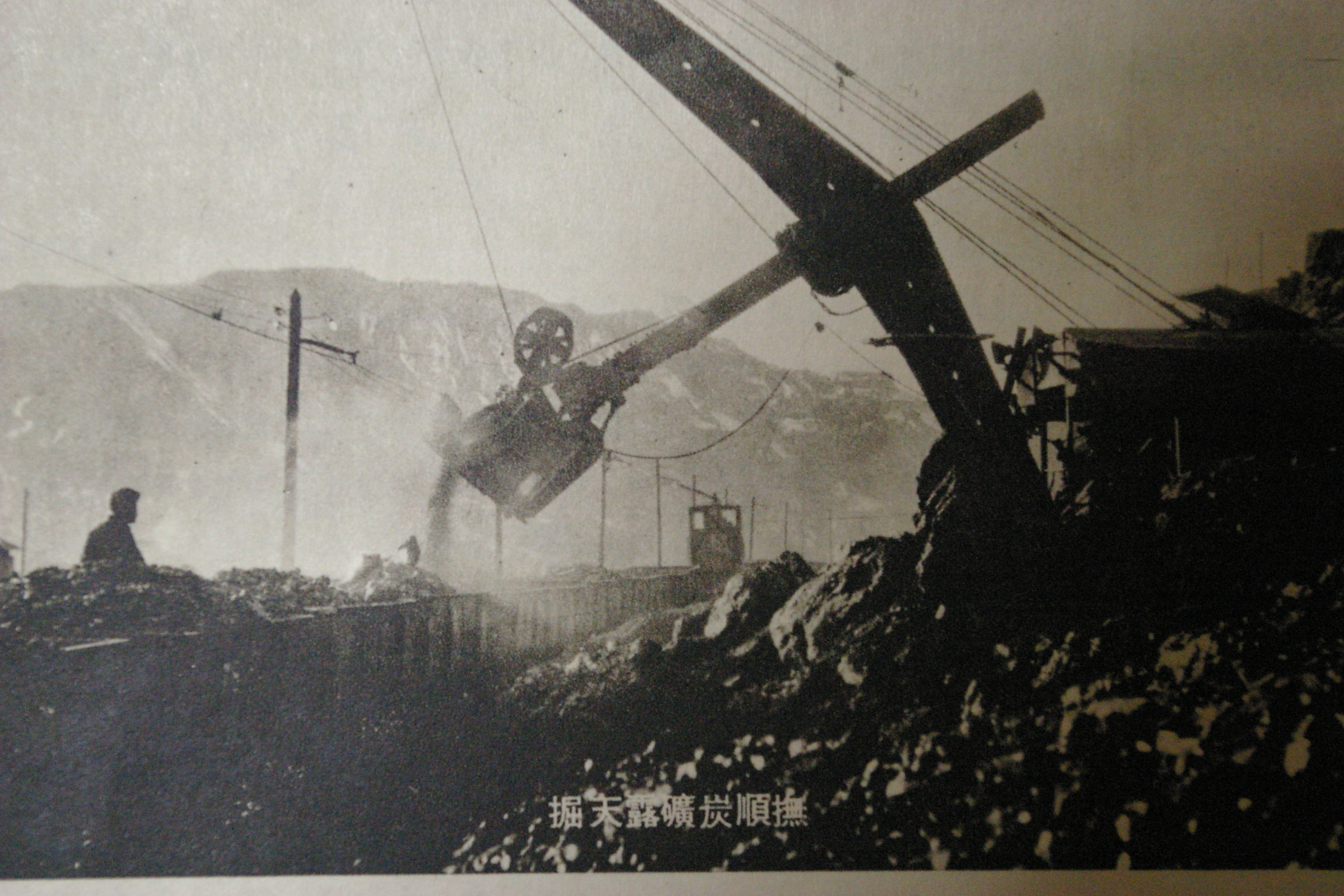
Coal mining at Fushun, Liaoning, c. 1940, operating under the control of the Japanese

The ROC had implemented income tax in 1914, but suspended it in 1916. It sought revised its income tax regulations in 1928, planned for implementation in 1929, but then put the regulations on hold. The ROC established another income tax system in 1936 and it remained in place (with some revisions) until the ROC's defeat in the Chinese Civil War.

After Japan's 1931 invasion of Manchuria, the Republic of China began state-led industrialization policies as a response to the risk of full-scale war with Japan. In 1932, it formed a clandestine industrial mobilization government agency, the National Defense Planning Commission (renamed in 1935 to the National Resources Commission). Chinese policymakers drew inspiration from economic models used by the Soviet Union, Japan, and Germany.

From the summer of 1937 through the end of 1949, the Chinese economy suffered inflation and hyperinflation. In 1937, Japan invaded China and the resulting warfare laid waste to China. Most of the prosperous east coast was quickly conquered by the Japanese, who imposed a brutal occupation on the civilian population, carrying out numerous atrocities such as the Rape of Nanjing in 1937 and random massacres of whole villages. By October 1938, the Japanese occupied Wuhan and Guangzhou; the Nationalist government has lost its economic center. Tax revenues decreased drastically while military expenses remained high.

The ROC government's tried unsuccessfully to curb inflation with the introduction of new currencies and failed attempts in both 1942 and 1943 to institute a general price freeze. The efforts at price controls failed because China's agricultural economy was very concentrated, industry was declining, and exchange rates collapsing. The result was that suppliers did not ration at stable prices, shopkeepers used their supplies for speculation, and “[e]ven productive enterprises turned from new output to speculating on stocks, while disinvestment and capital flight further undermined the production capacities.”

The economic situation further worsened as China became increasingly isolated once Japan occupied British Burma and French Indochina. In 1942–1943, the American Dollar Bond scandal arose. After the 1941 Japanese declaration of war against the United States and the United Kingdom, the two allies sought to support China in a concrete way despite logistical limitations following the loss of British Burma. The two countries loaned significant amounts of money to the Nationalist government. The Nationalist government of China decided to use US$200 million to absorb excess fabi in an effort to curb inflation. In theory, Chinese purchasers would use fabi to buy bonds at the official exchange rate and be paid in dollars when the bonds were redeemed following victory over Japan. The American Dollar Bonds were issued on 24 March 1942. The public response was poor, with few bond sales. In October 1943, H.H. Kung sent a secret memorandum to Chiang Kai-shek asking that the bond sales end. Subscriptions were closed on 15 October 1943, and a central bank official falsely announced that all bonds had been sold. Secretly, insiders then purchased the remaining bonds using currency acquired on the black market. The result was a windfall for Nationalist government insiders including Kung, the Soong family, Wei Daoming, Long Yun, and others. United States Treasury Secretary Henry Morgenthau Jr. reported to United States President Franklin D. Roosevelt that the US$200 million had been spent with little impact in curbing inflation. Within the Nationalist government of China, Kung was criticized for corruption, and the incident was significant in Chiang losing faith in Kung and removing him from politics.

The war brought about a massive increase in government control of industries. In 1936, government-owned industries were only 15% of GDP. In 1938, the ROC established a commission for industries and mines to control and supervise firms, as well as instilling price controls. By 1942, 70% of the capital of Chinese industry were owned by the government.

The Japanese Air Force carried out systematic and often indiscriminate bombings of Chinese cities. Nationalist forces applied a "scorched earth" policy in response to the invasion; destroying the productive capacity of areas they had to abandon in the face Japanese military advances. The Japanese were in turn brutal in the face of any Chinese resistance they encountered, during one anti-guerilla sweep in 1942, the Japanese killed up to 200,000 civilians in a month. A further 2–3 million Chinese civilians died in a famine in Henan in 1942 and 1943. Overall the war is estimated to have killed between 20 and 25 million Chinese. It severely set back the development of the preceding decade. Industry was severely hampered after the war by devastating conflict as well as the inflow of cheap American goods. By 1946, Chinese industries operated at 20% capacity and produced just 25% of pre-war output.

When Japan surrendered in August 1945, the KMT government was able to recover most of the economic centers lost in Second Sino-Japanese War without subjecting them to further destruction. However this ultimately made little difference given the extent of the damage caused by the war and subsequent Japanese occupation. Initially Manchuria, which Japan had transformed into the greatest industrial center in the Far East, had escaped any large scale destruction until the Soviet invasion in the final week of the war. The Red Army rapidly overran Japanese forces, commencing a 3-month occupation defined by systemic campaign of looting and destruction. Soviet Premier Josef Stalin ordered all equipment, moveable parts, tools and even material wealth plundered from private homes, shipped back to the USSR, what could not be pillaged was to be destroyed. When the Soviets withdrew in October, the result was near total. What had been China's industrial epicenter was reduced to rubble, virtually all factories had been destroyed, not a single mine was operational. Manchuria had been stripped of virtually all heavy machinery and was left without even electricity as the Soviets had dismantled or destroyed all power plants, even removing the turbines from dams.

In 1944, the advance of Japan's Ichigo campaign cut the Nationalist-controlled areas of China in half. One-fourth of China's manufacturing base was destroyed in the campaign. The loss of more manufacturing, particularly in conjunction with Japanese occupation of major grain production areas, further weakened the Nationalist economy. Throughout the war, but especially after the Ichigo campaign, the Nationalist government could not pay its bills.

The Nationalist government seized Japanese-held businesses at the time of the Japanese surrender. The Nationalist government made little effort to return these businesses to their original Chinese owners. A mechanism existed through which Chinese and foreign owners could petition for the return of their former property. In practice, the Nationalist government and its officials retained a great deal of the seized property and embezzling property, particularly from warehouses, was common. Nationalist officials sometimes extorted money from individuals in liberated territories under threat of labeling them as Japanese collaborators.

== Hyperinflation, civil war and the relocation of the republic government to Taiwan ==
The inflation that had started during the Second Sino-Japanese War became chronic hyperinflation by the middle of the 1940s and continued to worsen after the war's end. Chiang gave absolute priority preparing for war with the Communists, did not reduce military spending, and kept the military on an active war footing after the defeat of Japan. His focus on controlling northeast China in particular required major logistical and administrative expenses without raising commensurate revenue. The Nationalist government continued to face high expenses and low revenue, printing currency in an effort to make up for the difference. The Nationalist government failed to revive sources of revenue, commodity taxes and customs. Customs revenues were further impaired as customs official's salaries continued to fall further behind inflation and officials turned to corruption.

Nearly all studies of the collapse of the Nationalist government describe hyperinflation as a major factor for the government's failure. The rampant corruption of the KMT, hyperinflation from the over issuing of currency and the drain on the civilian population caused by the war effort, stirred mass unrest throughout China, fostering sympathy for the communist cause.

In 1949, communist forces began making rapid advancements against the collapsing Nationalist army. By October the communists had captured Beijing, with Nanjing falling soon after. The People's Republic of China was proclaimed on 1 October 1949. The KMT seemed powerless to even slow communist expansion and Chiang ordered an evacuation of the Republic of China to Taiwan, one of the only industrialized parts of China not to experience large scale destruction during the war. The relocation was intended to be only temporary as Chiang planned to regroup and reorganize his forces before returning to reconquer the mainland.

The communists gained significant legitimacy by defeating hyperinflation in the late 1940s and early 1950s. Their development of state trading agencies reintegrated markets and trading networks, ultimately stabilizing prices. In addition, the communists' promise to redistribute land gained them support among the massive long suffering rural population.

As the KMT fled, it stripped China of liquid assets including gold, silver, and the country's dollar reserves. KMT forces also attempted to firebomb industrial sites, but workers were able to stop them at many such locations. By the time the KMT was defeated, commerce had been destroyed, the national currency rendered valueless, and the economy was based on barter.

Despite years of planning, no KMT offensive to retake mainland China would ever materialize, with the ROC existing in permanent exile on the island. Taiwan continued to prosper under the Republic of China government and came to be known as one of the Four Asian Tigers due to its "economic miracle", and later became one of the largest sources of investment in mainland China after the PRC economy began its rapid growth following Deng's reforms.

== Schools of academic analysis ==
There have been two major competing interpretations (traditionalist vs revisionist) among scholars who have studied China's economy in the late Qing and Republican period.

The traditionalists (mainly historians like Lloyd Eastman, Joseph Esherick and others) view China's economic performance from the early 19th to the middle 20th century as abysmal. They view the traditional economic and political system during the late Qing and Republican periods as being unable to respond to the pressures of the West and inhibiting economic growth. These scholars stress the turning point in 1949 when the PRC is founded as acting as allowing for the political and economic revolution required that led to fast economic growth.

The revisionists (mainly economists like Thomas Rawski, Loren Brandt and others) view the traditional economy as mostly successful with slow but steady growth in GDP per capita after the late 19th century. These scholars focus on the continuity of between features of the traditional economy and the PRC economy with its rapid growth. They believe that the Republican and late Qing periods were fundamental to the PRC's later economic growth.

Academic Gregory Chow summarizes recent scholarship when he concludes that "in spite of political instability, economic activities carried on and economic development took place between 1911 and 1937," and in short, "modernization was taking place." Up until 1937, he continues, China had a market economy which was "performing well", which explains why China was capable of returning to a market economy after the reform and opening up started in 1978.

== Relevant Studies on Economic History of China (before 1949) ==
Moreover, scholars from management and marketing have relied on multilateral sources scattered in magazines, newspapers, personal notes, memoirs, corporate documents, and government archives to examine various topics of pre-1949 Chinese business and marketing history. These topics include nationalistic boycott, pawnbroking, business cliques (or Shangbang), the marketing and consumption of hybridized products, the marketing of Beijing Opera (Jingju) costumes, and the principal-agent problem in business, among others.

== See also ==
- Economic history of China (1949–present)
- Economic history of China before 1912
- Economy of China
- Economy of Hong Kong
- Economy of Macau
- Economy of Taiwan
- Economy of the Han dynasty
- Economy of the Ming dynasty
- Economy of the Qing dynasty
- Economy of the Song dynasty

== Bibliography and further reading ==
- Chow, Gregory C. China's Economic Transformation (2nd ed. 2007) excerpt and text search
- Eastman Lloyd et al. The Nationalist Era in China, 1927–1949 (1991) excerpt and text search
- Fairbank, John K., ed. The Cambridge History of China, Vol. 12, Republican China 1912–1949. Part 1. (1983). 1001 pp., the standard history, by numerous scholars
- Fairbank, John K. and Feuerwerker, Albert, eds. The Cambridge History of China. Vol. 13: Republican China, 1912–1949, Part 2. (1986). 1092 pp., the standard history, by numerous scholars
- Ji, Zhaojin. A History of Modern Shanghai Banking: The Rise and Decline of China's Finance Capitalism. (Armonk, NY: M.E. Sharpe, 2003 ISBN 0765610027). 325pp.
- Rawski, Thomas G. and Lillian M. Li, eds. Chinese History in Economic Perspective, University of California Press, 1992 complete text online
- Rawski, Thomas G. Economic Growth in Prewar China. Berkeley: University of California Press, 1989. 448pp ISBN 0520063724.
- Rubinstein, Murray A., ed. Taiwan: A New History (2006), 560pp
- Shiroyama, Tomoko. China during the Great Depression: Market, State, and the World Economy, 1929–1937 (2008)
- Sun, Jian, Economic History of China (中国经济通史), Vol 2 (1840–1949), China People's University Press, ISBN 7300029531, 2000.
- Young, Arthur Nichols. China's Nation-Building Effort, 1927–1937: The Financial and Economic Record (1971) 553 pages full text online
