= Global silver trade from the 16th to 19th centuries =

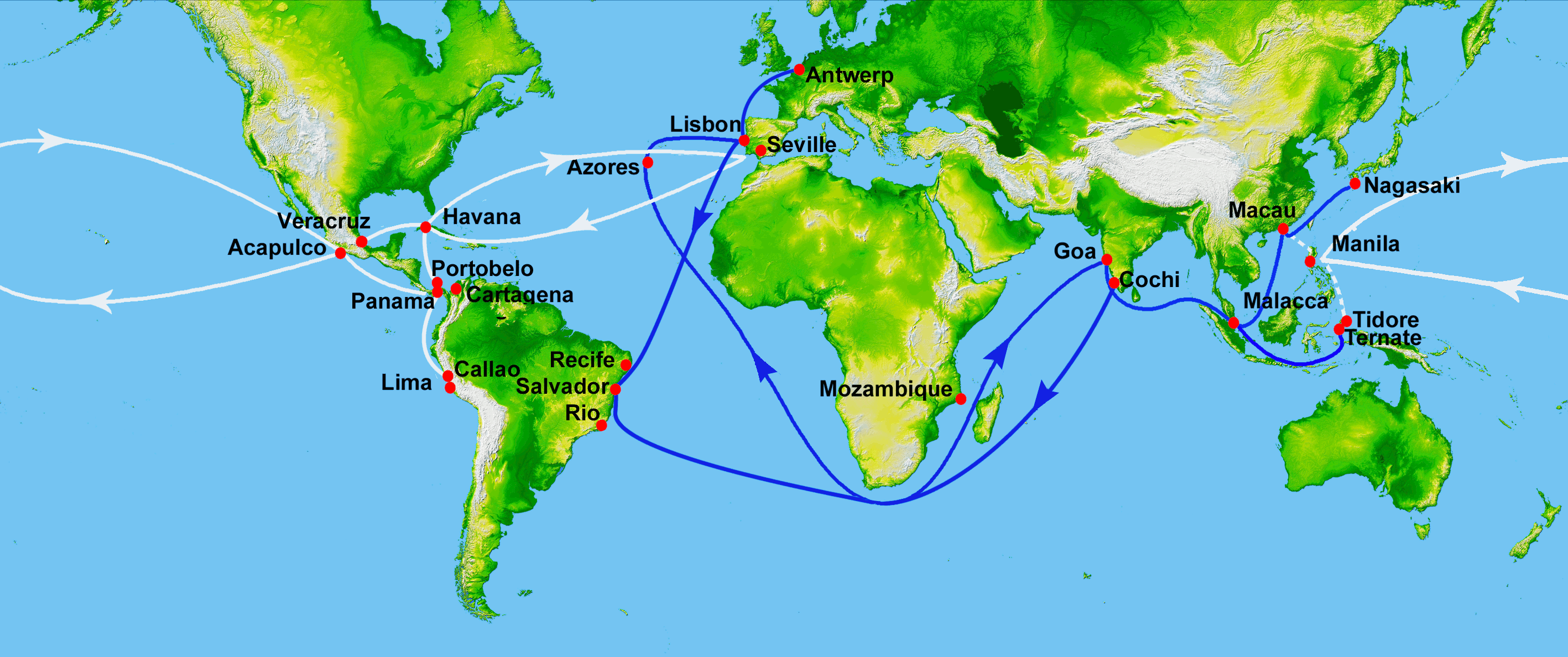
White represents the route of the Manila galleons in the Pacific and the flota in the Atlantic, which mainly carried silver. (Blue represents Portuguese routes which primarily focused on spices.)

The global silver trade between the Americas, Europe, and China from the sixteenth to nineteenth centuries was a spillover of the Columbian exchange which had a profound effect on the world economy. Many scholars consider the silver trade to mark the beginning of a genuinely global economy, with one historian noting that silver "went round the world and made the world go round". Although global, much of that silver ended up in the hands of the Chinese, as they accepted it as a form of currency. In addition to the global economic changes the silver trade engendered, it also put into motion a wide array of political transformations in the early modern era. "New World mines", concluded several prominent historians such as Flynn Dennis, "supported the Spanish empire", acting as a linchpin of the Spanish economy.

Spaniards at the time of the Age of Discovery discovered vast amounts of silver, much of which was from the Potosí silver mines, to fuel their trade economy. Potosí's deposits were rich and Spanish American silver mines were the world's cheapest sources of it. The Spanish acquired the silver, minting it into the peso de ocho to then use it as a means of purchase; that currency was so widespread that even the United States accepted it as valid until the Coinage Act of 1857. As the Spanish need for silver increased, new innovations for more efficient extraction of silver were developed, such as the amalgamation method of using mercury to extract silver from ore.

In the two centuries that followed the discovery of Potosí in 1545, the Spanish silver mines in the Americas produced 40,000 tons of silver. Altogether, more than 150,000 tons of silver were shipped from Potosí by the end of the 18th century. From 1500 to 1800, Bolivia and Mexico produced about 80% of the world's silver with 30% of it eventually ending up in China. In the late 16th and early 17th century, Japan was also exporting heavily into China and the foreign trade at large.

As has been demonstrated, China dominated silver imports. China's huge demand of the silver was caused by the failure of making paper money "Hong Wu Tong Bao" and "Da Ming Tong Bao Chao" and the difficulties when making copper coins. After various status changes in China history, silver played a more important role in the market and became a dominant currency in China in the 1540s. The silver flow into China passed through two cycles: the Potosí /Japan Cycle, which lasted from the 1540s to the 1640s, and the Mexican Cycle, which began in the first half of the 1700s. The market value of silver in the Ming territory was double its value elsewhere, which provided great arbitrage profit for the Europeans and Japanese. The room for arbitrage profit was further enlarged because of the silver content difference between silver ingots from Ming and Qing China and New World silver. At the same time, China also made significant arbitrage earnings in the markets for silks, ceramics, and other non-silver, which formed a multiple arbitrage system. In addition, the abundance of silver in China made it easy for the country to mint it into coinage and many methods and tools for identifying and measuring silver appeared to solve the problem caused by the difficulty in identifying and measure silver from 16th to 19th century. That process was so widespread that local Chinese government officials would demand taxes to be paid in silver to the point that silver eventually backed all of China's economy.

== Silver in the Americas ==
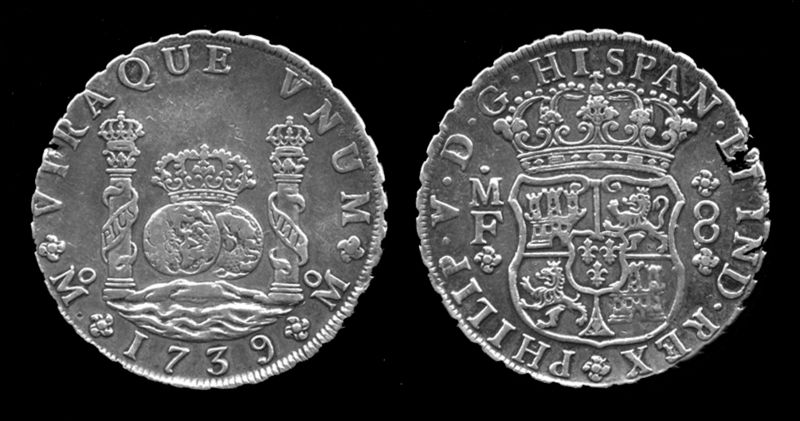
Silver Peso of Philip V

A major drive of the Spanish colonization of the Americas during the late 15th and 16th centuries was the discovery, production, and trading of precious metals at a time when there was a severe shortage of them. The Spanish, along with other European nations, likewise had a great desire for Chinese goods such as silk and porcelain. Conversely, the Europeans did not have any goods or commodities which China desired, so they traded their newly mined silver from the Americas which was badly needed in China at the time due to long running silver shortages, in order to make up for their trade deficit. The two most important mining colonies of the Spanish Empire were Bolivia and Mexico, who were estimated to have provided one-hundred thousand tons of silver from the mid-16th century to the end of the colonial period in 1824. The richest and most productive mine in the Americas was that of Potosí then located within the Viceroyalty of Peru, in what is now modern day Bolivia. The richest camp in Mexico was the city of Zacatecas, followed by other places in the Mexican Bajío (then a part of the Viceroyalty of New Spain). Most silver was extracted in Mexico, however, production of any single Mexican mine was far less than that of Potosí, until surpassed by Guanajuato also in the Bajío in the 18th century.

=== Mining processes in the Americas ===
The location of major 18th century Spanish silver mine districts (crossed pickaxes) and the mines involved in mercury supply needed for silver mining (purple dots).

Relatively simple mining and processing techniques of the Incas and other indigenous people dominated American silver mining for the early part of the 16th century. However, mining in the Americas became reliant on mercury amalgamation after it was developed and popularized in the mid-16th century. Mercury amalgamation dramatically increased the volume of silver production in the Americas, giving way to silver's central role in American economies and the burgeoning global economy. From 1575 to 1590, the use of amalgamation multiplied the output of Potosí, the most prominent Andean silver mine, by six. The presence of mercury at Huancavelica coupled with the abundance of cheap labor supplied by the rotational labor system mita made this intense production possible. Mercury amalgamation was invented by a Spaniard in central Mexico in the 1550s. Historians dispute which individual was the first to invent the process, but most agree that it was a Spaniard. Mercury represented one of the highest costs of production for the Americas, since much of it had to be shipped from Almadén in Spain. The ratio of mercury to silver produced was about two to one. Furthermore, German miners introduced the stamp mill and lead smelting in the 1530s. Gunpowder was often used to blast large holes to create the mine shafts, although there were not many deep shafts. Potosí had the most ore, however it was lower quality than that of Mexico.

Mining production in the Americas largely depended on native Amerindian labor in both Mexico and Bolivia. In Mexico, many of the natives worked as wage laborers by the middle of the 17th century. However, the labor system known as the repartimiento still existed in some places. Silver production in Mexico was relatively cheap when compared to that of Bolivia, and the general trend of Mexican labor systems was that towards waged labor. In Bolivia's mines, the mit'a system was a dominant form of native labor subjection, although waged laborers worked on the mines as well. Natives under the mit'a system were paid much less, and this was necessary for the production of silver to continue in Bolivia where costs were relatively high.

== Measurement and identification of silver ==
Silver was used as money in the silver trade from 16th to 19th centuries. To gain more benefits, deceptive methods were used. Therefore, there are many books, such as Yinpu, Bianyinpu and Xinzenggeguoyinshilunjie on silver identification in this period. In the deceptive method such as wrapping lead or copper in silver were introduced in this book.

At the same time, the amount of silver cannot be quickly and easily identified, so many methods of silver measurements have been studied. For example, Yuanbao, a fixed weight of silver, was used to facilitate trading. Dengtou, a tool for measuring the weight of silver, were also used.

== First paper money ==
The world's first paper money ("flying money") was invented by the Chinese and they needed some commodity to back it. Traditional coins were useful, but the amount of coins needed for large purchases could be bulky and dangerous to transport. That problem was solved when the Chinese created small pieces of paper with pictures of the coin printed on them. By the nature of their geography, China had no real amount of precious metals of their own to back the paper money they invented. Because the Spaniards did not find gold but did find copious amounts of silver in Bolivia and Mexico, the Spaniards and the rest of Europe used this silver to purchase the commodities of choice from China, solving both of their problems.

== The status change of silver ==
From 960 to 1276, the Song dynasty in China's history, the importance of silver kept increasing as a currency in a long period of time.

In 1375, the beginning of the Ming dynasty, the Hongwu Emperor of Ming established Hongwu Tongbao and Da Ming Baochao as the currency of China. At the same time, he banned gold and silver as currency, which led to the decreasing importance of these two precious metals. Baochao was abolished as a currency in 1425. In addition, Ming did not have enough money to make copper coins, which was the first currency in the first dynasty. Therefore, copper coin making was banned in the early 1430s.

Great Ming Bao Chao

In the 1540s, because of the failure of making paper money and the difficulties when making copper coins, silver played a more important role in the market and became a dominant currency in China.

In 1567, the Ming dynasty lifted legal prohibitions on foreign trade, but maintained a ban on Sino-Japanese trade. Southwestern Taiwan was utilized as a location outside of Ming jurisdiction for Japanese merchants, in particular, to sell silver to Fujianese buyers.

== Global flow of silver ==
=== Into China ===
The history of global trade in silver with China can be divided into several periods, including the Potosí/Japan Cycle from the 1540s to 1640s and the Mexican Cycle in the first half of the 1700s.

The Potosí/Japan cycle started in the 1540s because of the decline of the paper money system in China during the Ming dynasty resulting from inflation and the prevalence of counterfeit money. In 1571, Spain started the trade directly with China in the Americas. The Manila galleon trade reached its peak in 1597, when the trade quantity surpassed 1.2 million pesos. Although the economy performed poorly in 1632, trade increased by 0.24 million pesos every year. With the increase in silver accumulation in the Americas and Japan and the balancing of the Chinese silver supply and demand market due to the large amount of silver imports, the price of Chinese silver and world silver prices converge and the Potosí/Japan Cycle comes to an end in the 1640s.

The Mexican Cycle refers to the first half of the 1700s. During this time, China's population came into a boom because of the importation of hardy American crops, such as sweet potatoes, corn and peanuts. A chain reaction followed swiftly: the development of China's silver market, and growing demand of silver in China. At the same time, the silver industry in Latin America, especially in Mexico came in to a boom and became the main source of silver exports to China.

=== Global silver trade ===
The ultimate destination for much of the silver produced in the Americas and Japan was China. Silver from the Americas flowed mostly across the Atlantic and made its way to the Far East. A popular route was around the Cape of Good Hope into the east, and sometimes it came over land. Major outposts for the silver trade were located in Southeast Asian countries, such as the Spanish Philippines. The city of Manila served as a primary outpost of the exchange of goods between the Americas, Japan, India, Indonesia and China. However, a large amount of silver was transported across the vast Pacific Ocean directly from the Americas as well, via the Manila Galleons. There are few records of the amount of silver which crossed the Pacific due to it being discouraged by the Spanish monarchy, so estimates vary greatly.

During the 16th and 17th centuries, a large amount of silver also remained in the Americas, accumulated through the business of local merchants. Royal officials in various parts of Spanish America often protected the activities of local merchants and enacted protectionist policies that encouraged local monopolies. This meant that royal officials were not solely interested in accumulating silver for Spain's economy, but rather, they also had a vested interest in developing the economies of their specific localities. Additionally, much of the silver that was eventually exported still circulated extensively in the Americas before finding its way to port cities for export. For example, the situado, a regular remittance of silver from the mines of Potosí to Buenos Aires by way of mule trains, did not merely result in the transport of silver. Instead, those transporting the situado would also use their access to silver to conduct their own deals along the road, thus regularly injecting silver into the areas along the route of the situado. Even when this exchanged silver eventually ended up in Buenos Aires or another port city where it was exported, it facilitated numerous transactions within the Americas before it got there.

Silver also found its way across other parts of the world as well. India and Europe both received a fair amount of silver. This silver was often locally traded for other commodities, such as gold or crops. In India, silver flowed from the south to the north, and gold flowed the opposite way. Often silver and gold were manufactured into jewelry or hoarded as treasure.

=== China and the demand for silver ===
China was the ultimate destination towards which silver would flow. In exchange, the Chinese traded their popular goods such as silk and porcelain. China had a high demand for silver due to its shift from paper money to coins in the early period of the Ming dynasty. The Ming paper currency eventually failed due to self-imposed inflation along with an inability to stop the production of counterfeit bills. The Ming attempted to produce copper coins as a new form of currency, but production was inconsistent. Hence silver became of high value because it was a valid currency that could be processed abroad. The bimetallic ratio of silver to gold was about two to one, which meant that European and Japanese merchants made a large amount of profit. The difference in silver content between silver ingots from Ming–Qing China and New World silver, ranging from 3% to 8%, further increased the scope for arbitrage in the global flow of silver.

The trade between China, Japan, and Southeast Asian nations in both expensive goods like silk products and inexpensive ones like sugar continues developing in the second half of the 16th century. Gross profits ranging from 100% to 300% in the trade of these commodities can be eared by China, and lower price of the product itself means the greater room for profits. At the same time, European and Japanese traders profited from the price difference between Chinese silver and the rest of the world. Silver-commodities trades between China and other countries are essentially multiple arbitrages.

In the 1640s, the bimetallic ratios in China converged with the rest of the world, before experiencing another population boom. The new population boom was a product of the introduction of New World crops into China, mainly sweet potatoes, which could be more easily grown. By this time, the silver mines in Japan were largely depleted and the New World became China's primary source for silver.

Initially, Japan served as China's primary source for silver in the 16th century. In exchange for silver, China would provide Japan with silk and gold. Japan and China did not directly trade with each other, due to political tensions. This meant that European entities and countries, such as the Dutch and Portuguese served as a middle man between the two countries.

==== Middlemen in the silver flow: Portuguese ====
Because of the large demand of silver in China, and the need for money for people in China during the Potosí/Japan flow (1540s–1640s), Portuguese traders partnered with Chinese smugglers, bringing silver from Japan, Britain, and France to China. The role of middlemen connecting the silver flows from Japan to China in the silver trade was highly lucrative and the profits Portuguese made financed Macao, the toehold Portugal established off the southeast coast of China, with tacit Chinese consent. In 1540, Japanese ports became a hotspot for Chinese traders seeking to obtain silver, a precious commodity in China. This influx of Chinese traders coincided with the arrival of Portuguese seafarers in East Asian waters. Portuguese traders quickly partnered with Chinese smugglers to bypass the Ming maritime embargo and transport Japanese silver to the Chinese market. During the period from 1583 to 1591, when the Portuguese sailed from Macau in China to Japan, they transported luxurious items such as white silk, gold, musk, and porcelain, but their return journey from Japan was solely dedicated to carrying silver.

=== China's silver dominance ===
In The Wealth of Nations, Adam Smith noted the sheer force and great reach of the global silver trade. He was impressed by its market value but more intrigued with the way this single item of commerce brought together new and old worlds, i.e. the Americas and China. Although China acted as the cog driving the wheel of global trade, Japan's huge contribution of silver exports to China were critical to the world economy and China's liquidity and success with the commodity. Silver was paramount to East Asia's introduction into the global trade market. Under the Ming and Qing dynasties, China hoarded silver to boost its economy and increase its trading power.

Many historians argue that silver was responsible for the birth of global economics and trade. According to this view, global trade commenced in 1571 when Manila was founded and became the first trading post linking America and Asia due to the expansive and profitable silver trade. Scholars find the amount of silver traveling from Manila to China was approximately three million pesos or 94,000 kilograms in the early 1600s.

The rarity of silver production was seen as an opportunity for China to control the currency's value and support its own national currency. Silver was one of the only accepted trade items from Europeans and its value in China was astronomical compared to rest of the world. Between 1600 and 1800 China received 100 tons of silver on average per year. A large populace near the Lower Yangtze averaged hundreds of taels of silver per household in the late 16th century.

Later on, the sudden ban on Spanish silver imports to China imposed by the Qing dynasty after defeating the Ming in 1644, along with a long period of economic stagnation and recession due to famines and bad financial policies back in Spain, simultaneously combined with devastating losses sustained towards the end of the Thirty Years' War, all precipitated the significant decline of the Spanish Empire in the second half of the 17th century, and its eclipse by France, and, later, Great Britain.

Silver even played a large role when defending against Toyotomi Hideyoshi's attempted takeover of Joseon Korea. The Ming Ministry of War sent approximately 140,000 liang (approximately 7 tonnes) of silver to its soldiers and required provinces to provide silver as tax for the war effort as well. In the sixteenth century, the daimyos of Southwest Japan hoped for unregulated global trade but were stopped due to Ming China trade policies. Still, Japan became a player in the global economy via frequent Wokou ships arriving to extract Japan's abundance of silver and exchange goods. Japan increased its wealth through successful trilateral trade with Portugal and China as Japan now had Chinese goods to offer the Portuguese who had silver mines of their own. Founder of the Ming dynasty, Hongwu, actually sought to eliminate silver from the market due to his fear of inflation which he previously experienced under the Yuan dynasty. His attempt involved imposing harsh limits on silver mining to stop its flow into the market and subsequently replaced it with baochao or paper money. However, the currency never popularized and silver persisted as a global currency.

== Opium imports ==
Despite some restrictions, silver continued to drive trade through its popularity in Europe. This, combined with a high British demand for Chinese tea, created chronic trade deficits for European governments, which were forced to risk silver deficits to supply merchants in Asia. As supplies of silver decreased in Europe, Europeans had less ability to purchase highly coveted Chinese goods. Merchants were no longer able to sustain the China trade through profits made by selling Chinese goods in the West and were forced to take bullion out of circulation in Europe to buy goods in China.

In the late 18th century, British merchants from the East India Company began to introduce Indian opium to Chinese markets. The demand for opium rose rapidly and was so profitable that Chinese opium dealers began to seek out more suppliers of the drug, thus inaugurating the opium trade; one merchant declared that Opium "is like gold. It can sell any time." From 1804 to 1820, a period when the Qing dynasty needed to finance the suppression of the White Lotus Rebellion, Chinese merchants were soon exporting silver to pay for opium rather than Europeans paying for Chinese goods with the precious metal.

The Qing imperial court debated whether and how to end the opium trade, eventually settling on regulations on consumption. That measure, however, resulted in an increase in drug smuggling by Europeans and Chinese traders. In 1810, the Daoguang Emperor issued an edict concerning the matter, declaring, "Opium has a harm. Opium is a poison, undermining our good customs and morality. Its use is prohibited by law." Following a debate at court in 1836 on whether to legalize the drug or crack down on its use, the emperor decided on the latter. An upright official, Commissioner Lin Zexu led the campaign against opium as a kind of "drug czar". The British, offended by the seizure of their property in opium, sent a large naval expedition to China to end the restrictive conditions under which they had long traded with that country. Thus began the First Opium War, in which Britain's industrialized military might was proven in China's rout. The Treaty of Nanking, which ended the war in 1842 largely on British terms, imposed numerous restrictions on Chinese sovereignty and opened five ports to European traders.

== See also ==
- Silver mining
- Bullionism
- Price revolution
- Economic history of China before 1912
- Spanish Empire
- Dutch East India Company
- East India Company
- Trade dollar (United States coin)
- Great Potosí Mint Fraud of 1649
