= Robert Bagley =

American art historian

Robert W. Bagley
- Education: Harvard University (BA, MA, PhD); University of Chicago (MS)
- Employer: Princeton University
- Known for: Chinese Art & Archaeology

Robert Bagley is an American sinologist. He is a professor of Chinese art history and archaeology at Princeton University.

== Career ==
Bagley specialises in pre-Han art and archaeology with other academic interests, including ornament, archaeometallurgy and ancient metal technology, archaic Chinese jades, comparative study of the first civilizations and the first writing systems, and the archaeology of ancient Chinese music.

== Education ==
Bagley received his B.A. in 1967, M.A. in 1973, and his Ph.D. in 1981 from Harvard University. In 1969, he obtained an M.S. from the University of Chicago.

== Selected publications ==
- Max Loehr and the Study of Chinese Bronzes: Style and Classification in the History of Art. Ithaca, NY: Cornell East Asia Series, 2008.
- “Anyang Writing and the Origin of the Chinese Writing System.” Chapter 7 (pp. 190–249) in Stephen D. Houston, ed., The First Writing. Cambridge: Cambridge University Press, 2004.
- Bagley, Robert, ed. (2001). Ancient Sichuan: Treasures from a Lost Civilization. Princeton, NJ: Princeton University Press. ISBN 9780691088518.
- Shang Archaeology.” Chapter 3 (pp. 124–231) in Michael Loewe and Edward L. Shaughnessy, eds., The Cambridge History of Ancient China. Cambridge: Cambridge University Press, 1999.
- “Les techniques métallurgiques” (pp. 37–44) and “Les vases rituels au début de l’âge du bronze” (pp. 57–64) in Rites et festins de la Chine antique: Bronzes du musée de Shanghai. Paris: Musée Cernuschi, 1998.
- Shang Ritual Bronzes in the Arthur M. Sackler Collections. Cambridge MA: Harvard University Press, 1987.
