= Single whip law =

Fiscal law of the Ming dynasty

The single whip law or the "single whip reform" (traditional Chinese: 一條鞭法; simplified Chinese: 一条鞭法; pinyin: Yì Tiáo Biān Fǎ) was a fiscal law first instituted during the middle Ming dynasty, in the early 16th century, and then promulgated throughout the empire in 1580 by Zhang Juzheng.

The measure aimed primarily to simplify the complex fiscal code under Ming law, by commuting most obligations towards the central government – from land and poll taxes to the labour obligations of the peasantry and the tributes of prefectural and county officials – into a single silver payment, at a level based on the population and cultivated land in each prefecture. Therefore, by reducing complexity, the single whip law reduced the costs of tax collection, while also increasing the tax base.

The unit of tax collection was changed from rice to silver, which led to an increase in the import of silver into China from Japan and Spanish America. The single whip law led to a temporary increase in European trade, but in the long term, contributed to the overthrow of the Ming dynasty by destabilizing the tax system. In regions not well integrated into the network of global trade, such as along the Ming northern border, silver was more expensive, making it harder for farmers to deliver upon their tax obligations. Underfunded local governments laid off soldiers and clerks from northern border garrisons, some of whom formed rebel groups which participated in rebellions starting in the northwest in the 1620s. In order to put down these rebellions, the Ming court sent eunuchs to wealthy areas, such as silk-weaving Suzhou, to impose new taxes. A tax on looms pushed weavers in Suzhou to revolt, spreading riots and arson to other crowded cities. With the implementation of the isolationist policy of Sakoku in Japan in the 1630s, barring foreign traders who facilitated the import of silver into China by exchanging Chinese manufactured goods such as silk, porcelain, and cotton thread in exchange for Japanese silver, the amount of silver entering China was limited. This was further exacerbated by the 1634–1636 decrease in the Spanish shipment of silver to Manila from Spanish-controlled America, which, coupled with the Ming government's decision to debase copper coinage, greatly increased the price of silver. It was one of the factors leading to the fall of the Ming dynasty.
