= Criticism of Qing dynasty's economic performance =

Historiographical dispute about Chinese history

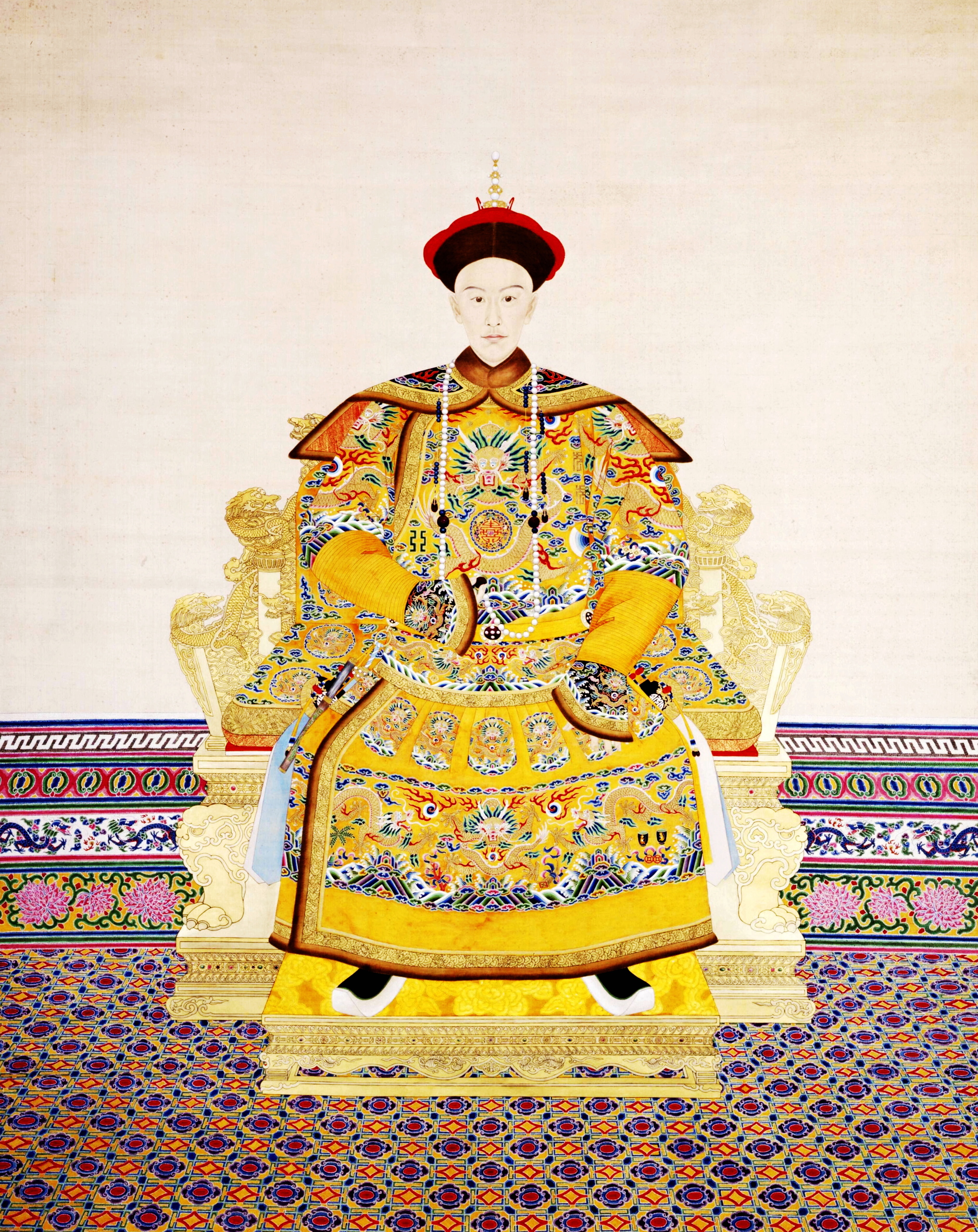
The Guangxu Emperor of the House of Aisin-Gioro, penultimate Emperor of the Qing dynasty

During the Manchu–led Qing dynasty, the economy was significantly developed and markets continued to expand especially in the High Qing era, and imperial China experienced a second commercial revolution in the economic history of China from the mid-16th century to the end of the 18th century. But akin to the other major non-European powers around the world at that time like the Islamic gunpowder empires and Tokugawa Japan, such economic development did not keep pace with the economies of European countries in the Industrial Revolution occurring by the early 19th century, which resulted in a dramatic change described by the 19th-century Qing official Li Hongzhang (who promoted the Self-Strengthening Movement) as "the biggest change in more than three thousand years" (三千年未有之大變局).

Critics of the Qing, some of whom may be motivated by Chinese nationalism and anti-Qing sentiment, argue that the specific actions and policies of the Qing dynasty held the nation-state of China back during its rule, when the Industrial Revolution which occurred in Europe by the 19th century led to a Great Divergence in which China lost its early modern economic and industrial lead over the West which it had previously held for more than a millennium. According to the critics, the advances in science and technology and economic development in the preceding Song and Ming dynasties moved China toward a modern age, but the restrictions placed on commerce and industry and the persecution of non-orthodox thought after the transition from Ming to Qing in the 17th century caused China to gradually stagnate and fall behind the West and led to the century of humiliation.

Scholars outside China generally disagree with such an argument, and many scholars instead emphasize the positive effects of the Qing dynasty's order on the Chinese economy. At the same time, American scholar Kenneth Pomeranz rejects the assertion that "certain Asian societies were headed toward an industrial breakthrough until Manchu or British invaders crushed the 'sprouts of capitalism'", although he suggests that the Qing revitalization of the state may have impeded the growth of "fashion". In conclusion, he sees the Great Divergence as resulting primarily from what happened in the West, rather than what failed to happen in the Qing Empire. He adds that the difference in the West that facilitated the Industrial Revolution was not accumulated past "progress" or a more inventive mindset but rather a number of historically particular "contingencies", above all Europe's colonial exploitation of the New World through the use of slave labor from Africa.

== Background ==
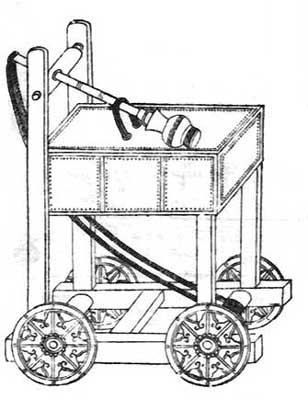
An illustration of a trebuchet catapult, as described in the Wujing Zongyao of 1044.

Different dates are offered for the beginning or end of ascendency and whether it was in economic, technological, or political terms. It has been argued that either the Ming or the Qing was the time when China fell behind, and either because of stagnation or because Europe or the West pulled ahead. The economic historian Angus Maddison calculates that in the 10th century China was the "world's leading economy in terms of per capita income," and that "between the fifteenth and eighteenth centuries economic leadership passed from China to Western Europe." He believes that China's lead did not happen until the fall of the Roman Empire and that China lost its lead because Europe pulled ahead, not because of domestic conditions. Some argue that China was the world's largest and most advanced economy for most of the past two millennia and among the wealthiest and most advanced economies until the 18th century or the early 19th century, followed by India in terms of both population and GDP. In a review of the field in 2006, the Harvard economic historian David Landes began by stating that "as late as the end of the first millennium of our era, the civilizations of Asia were well ahead of Europe in wealth and knowledge," but by five hundred years later, that is, in the early years of the Ming dynasty, "the tables had turned."

The economic historian Mark Elvin, drawing on the work of Japanese historians, argues that the Song dynasty (960–1279), experienced a revolution in agriculture, water transport, finance, urbanization, science and technology, but that China was then caught in a high level equilibrium trap. Others claim that the Song dynasty economic revolution brought proto-industrialization with large increases in per capita income as well as industrial and agricultural output. Some scholars have termed the phenomenon China's "medieval urban revolution".

The Mongol conquest inflicted a large population loss and devastated the economy but later the Ming dynasty brought a recovery in per capita incomes and economic output, surpassing Song dynasty heights. Late Ming laissez-faire policies such as nonintervention in markets and low taxes further stimulated commercialisation, as market agriculture replaced subsistence farming. Wage labour became increasingly common, as large-scale private industry developed, displacing indentured labor and often buying out government workshops. Historian Robert Allen estimates that family incomes and labor productivity of the Ming-era Yangtze Delta Region, the richest province of China, was far higher than contemporary Europe and exceeded the later Qing dynasty. However, the Qing encouraged settlements over larger portions of the empire since these regions offered the best opportunities to improve one's livelihood by clearing and farming large tracts. According to the scholar Kenneth Pomeranz, the average standard of living in the Qing Empire during the High Qing era was likely higher than that in Western Europe, and desirable but nonessential commodities such as sugar were consumed in greater quantities by the average Qing subject than by the average European. This only changed in the 19th century. William T. Rowe also described the period up to the High Qing era as a second commercial revolution, which was even more transformative than the first that occurred during the Song dynasty.

Some contend that economic and social developments during the late Ming paralleled the development of Europe in the 18th and the 19th centuries and that China would have entered a modern age had there been no Manchu conquest and no Qing dynasty. The Ming regime was ideologically rigid but cities and new wealth allowed room for intellectual fervor and liberalization. New thinkers like Wang Yangming and Li Zhi challenged orthodox Confucianism and argued that the words of Confucius and Mencius were fallible and that wisdom was universal. They also questioned government power over the economy and personal rights. Scholars of the Donglin school protested increases in government taxation during the Wanli Emperor, and restrictions on freedom of speech, advocating a program similar to classical liberalism. Ming dynasty scholars also investigated western science, such as Archimedes, although it is also pointed out that Chinese interest in the physical sciences and mathematics increased markedly in the 17th century, especially after the Ming-Qing transition. The Qing dynasty induced Jesuit experts to work as imperial minions in the government bureaucracy to augment their own projects of political and cultural control, using the latest mathematical, astronomical, military, and surveying techniques. Meanwhile, the European trend to imitate Chinese artistic traditions since the mid-to-late 17th century, known as chinoiserie gained great popularity in Europe in the 18th century (during the High Qing era) due to the rise in trade with (Qing) China and the broader current of Orientalism.

== Issues ==
In spite of the significant economic development during the Qing dynasty (especially during the High Qing era), critics hold that the specific policies of the Qing slowed China's economic and scientific advancement and allowed Western nations to surpass China, while most scholars outside China disagree with such argument. Specific Qing policies cited by critics include suppression of creative thought, literary persecution, discouragement of foreign trade, repressive domestic policies, rigid Neo-Confucianism emphasis on ideology rather than practical knowledge, disrespect for business and commerce, destructive fiscal and tax policy, as well as the devastation during the initial Ming-Qing transition. Though, such an argument appeared to focus primarily on the particular policies of the Qing, but not the developments of the contemporary European countries which gradually became colonial empires since the 16th century and also gained and extended lead over other previously dominant or comparable civilizations around the world such as the Ottoman Empire, Mughal India, and Safavid Iran, among others.

=== Devastation during the initial Ming-Qing transition ===
The Ming-Qing transition was one of the most devastating wars in Chinese history, and critics assert that it has set back Chinese progress decades. Places such as Sichuan and Jiangnan, were greatly devastated and depopulated during the chaos in the period, when the incumbent Ming dynasty (and later the Southern Ming), the emerging Qing dynasty, and several other factions like the Shun dynasty and Xi dynasty founded by peasant revolt leaders fought against each another, which, along with innumerable natural disasters at that time such as those caused by the Little Ice Age and epidemics like the Great Plague during the last decade of the Ming dynasty, killed an estimated 25 million people in total. Beginning in the 1630s, the combination of flight, deaths due to warfare, famine, and disease, and the deliberate genocide practice by the revolt leader Zhang Xianzhong reduced Sichuan's population by as much as 75%, leaving the huge province with perhaps fewer than a million inhabitants, most clustered in peripheral areas. In the lower Yangtze region there was also very bloody warfare. General Shi Kefa of the Southern Ming had ordered that the Yangzhou city be defended to the death, but in May 1645 it fell to Qing forces. Then the Yangzhou massacre took place, in which some 800,000 people, including women and children, were massacred by the Manchus and unruly Chinese soldiers in Qing employ. Some scholars estimate that the Chinese economy did not regain the level reached in the late Ming dynasty until the mid-Qing period.

It is also pointed out that the development of population often shows periodic fluctuations in China's long history, and the rise and fall of chaos in each dynasty (see dynastic cycle) was almost always accompanied by the increase or decrease of population; there would almost always be great social turmoil and great destruction whenever the old and new dynasties change. The destructive economic effects could be felt for decades, which appeared to be the case for the Ming-Qing transition. In the early 1690s, Tang Zhen (唐甄), a retired Chinese scholar and failed merchant wrote that "the four occupations are all impoverished" at the time. Due to warfare, famine, and disease the Chinese endured more than a half century of suffering since the 1630s before foreign trade and domestic commerce revived. However, by the century's end prosperity was slowing returning with the advent of favorable economic developments since the consolidation of the Qing Empire's governance. In 1713 the Kangxi Emperor announced his belief that the economic production of the empire had been fully restored to what it had been at the height of the Ming.

Meanwhile, China's population growth resumed and shortly began to accelerate. A consensus estimate might place the population in 1700 at about 150 million, roughly the same as it had been a century earlier under the Ming. By 1800 it had reached 300 million or more, and then rose further to around 450 million by the mid-19th century, as the most populous country in the world at the time. It is commonly agreed that pre-modern China's population experienced two growth spurts, one during the Northern Song period (960–1127), and other during the Qing period (around 1700–1830). Not only was the Qing population growth rate 40 percent greater than that of the Song, but the growth also proved to be more sustainable, decisively and permanently changing China's demographic trajectory.

The 18th century also saw the resettlement of deserted land, the opening of new fields, and a renewed commercial expansion spanning even larger portions of the empire. Economic growth in the middle and upper Yangtze regions complemented growth in the lower Yangtze, and parts of North and Northwest China also increased production, as more people began to move out of already crowded regions and into new lands of opportunity. Also, the Qing deliberately contributed to an unprecedented westward migration by abrogating most of the Ming's legal prohibitions on geographic mobility and provided various positive incentives. The dynamics of Smithian expansion were present throughout.

=== Restrictions on foreign trade ===
Critics most often point to Qing restriction of foreign trade. Despite the draconian restrictions imposed by the early Ming dynasty on trade, occupational activities, and geographic mobility, the late Ming government relaxed the ban on maritime trade to some extent in 1567, although the trade was restricted to only one port at Yuegang. This relaxation resulted in the existence of considerable commerce between China and oversea countries afterwards, estimated by Joseph Needham at nearly 300 million taels of silver from 1578 to 1644 (for comparison, the total Ming state revenues were from 20 to 30 million taels).

Nevertheless, during the early Qing dynasty while fighting with the Southern Ming and the Koxinga regime, foreign trade was prohibited completely from 1644 to 1683. Shortly after the annexation of Taiwan, the Qing opened all coastal ports to foreign trade in 1684, although it was later also restricted to only one port at Guangzhou (known as the Canton System), and commerce had to be conducted by the Thirteen Factories approved by the government, with competition prohibited. By the mid-Qing era China was possibly the most commercialized country in the world. The total amount of the empire's trade increased along with the expansion of overseas trade by the 19th century, and even more so during the Opium Wars when Western mercantile influence spread to inland cities.

In the early Qing period the Qing became alarmed at the potential for Qing subjects to travel abroad and involve themselves in "subversive activities" (especially serving under foreign regimes or colonies like the Dutch East Indies), thus discouraged Chinese subjects to go abroad, similar to (but considerably less strict than) the Sakoku (鎖国) policy in the contemporary Edo period Japan (1603–1868) and the isolationist policy in the contemporary Joseon dynasty Korea. At that time it was not the intent of the emperor to provide protection to overseas Chinese, or to protest the massacres carried out by the Spanish and Dutch colonial authorities against the Chinese, such as the 1740 Batavia massacre, even though the Qing did give serious thought to taking punitive measures. However, this policy had changed radically in the later period of the Qing dynasty. For example, the Qing court opposed and protested over the Chinese Exclusion Act in the United States and demanded restitution for Chinese nationals harmed in the anti-Chinese Rock Springs massacre and other acts of violence. Likewise, after the Torreón massacre in Mexico Qing China demanded reparation and official apologies from the Mexico government.

=== Restoration of serfdom ===
Critics cite the restoration of serfdom as another policy that greatly hampered the Chinese economy. China was never a "slave society", but the ratio of slaves and serfs to free persons in for example the Han dynasty was high, though the rate dropped throughout all Chinese history. Critics claim that Qing forces expropriated huge amounts of land, turning millions of people from tenant farmers into hereditary serfs, and the amount of land requisitioned amounted to nearly 16 million mou, or nearly 10,666 km^{2}, of farmland. According to critics, the serfdom was so common in the early Qing that slave markets were set up to buy and sell those who had been enslaved during the Qing expansion. However, in the 18th century the Qing dismantled the serfdom-based economy installed by the chieftains and introduced feudalism, and encouraged local people to use advanced technologies imported from China proper to improve their agricultural production. It is also pointed out that slavery was uncommon in the period (except debt "slaves"), and serfdom was virtually abolished by the Qing.

=== Literary persecution ===
While literary persecution existed in China prior to Qing rule, critics claim that it was rare and never widespread. However, it has been pointed out that the Ming dynasty was particularly notorious for the practice, and there were peaks of the literary persecutions which were very brutal during the Ming. Protests by scholars forced the late Ming government to declare that "speech will not be criminalized", and literary persecution existed in isolated cases during the last decades of the Ming, such as the Liu Duo (劉鐸) and Wei Zhongxian case in 1625.

In the 18th century the Qing government again used literary persecution frequently to destroy opposition to its rule. Several cases of literary persecution saw hundreds of intellectuals and their families executed, often for "minor" offenses such as referring to Manchus as "barbarians" and using the Qing character in areas that was deemed offensive by the government. Thousands of ancient texts deemed subversive were burned in the persecutions. Protests by scholars, which had been common during the late Ming period, were also suppressed. The persecutions extended to non-orthodox thought as well; scholars who disagreed with the standard Neo-Confucian theories were executed along with a scientist who argued that the brain, rather than the heart, was the centre of thought.

However, the literary persecution was officially abandoned by the Jiaqing Emperor in the turn of the 19th century, and ideas of speech freedom, public opinion, public deliberation, democracy and citizenry were advocated and practiced by Chinese newspapers in late Qing China. Shen Bao (申報), one of the most influential newspapers at the time, published a series of editorials advocating newspapers' role as public scrutiny organs over authorities. Other contemporaneous newspapers shared this public sphere ideology based on the free press, public discussion, public opinion, and monitoring of governments. The ideology was also widely accepted by the political and cultural elites in the late Qing period.

=== Domestic intervention ===
Critics claim that unlike the Ming dynasty who had adopted laissez-faire policies the Qing dynasty intervened in the economy far more than its predecessors, and that there was frequent intervention in the economy by restricting the number of merchants allowed to operate. The official edicts discouraged the cultivation of commercial crops, in favour of subsistence agriculture. Also, the Qing tried to regulate mining production to ensure social stability and proper moral behaviour, by usually refusing requests by rich merchants to open new mines, fearing an unruly labor force (while allowing mines to operate in poor areas to provide employment). Despite the scale of the Qing Empire's vast and thriving domestic trade, critics claim that such policies greatly damaged the Chinese economy.

However, it has also been pointed out that the Ming founder Zhu Yuanzhang severely restricted trade, occupations, and regional migration in the late 14th century (see Haijin), which significantly hampered the growth of China's domestic trade. Yet from the mid-16th century to the end of the 18th century (High Qing era) China experienced a second commercial revolution that was even more revolutionary than the first which occurred earlier in the Song dynasty. During the second commercial revolution, what historians sometimes refer to as a "circulation economy" or "commodity economy" developed, which allowed for an unparalleled level of commercialization in local agricultural community. For the first time, a considerable proportion of farm households in China started to produce a sizeable portion of their crop for sale and rely on market exchange for necessities. Cotton went from being almost unknown in the early Ming to being the most popular fabric for garments in China by the late Qing.

== See also ==
- Economic history of China before 1912
- Economy of the Qing dynasty
- Chinese nationalism
- Anti-Qing sentiment
- Self-Strengthening Movement
- Hundred Days' Reform
- Late Qing reforms
- Dark Ages (historiography)
- Commercial Revolution

== Sources ==
- Allen, Robert (2009), "Agricultural productivity and rural incomes in England and the Yangtze Delta, c.1620–c.1820" (PDF), The Economic History Review, 62 (3): 525–550, CiteSeerX 10.1.1.149.5916, doi:10.1111/j.1468-0289.2008.00443.x, S2CID 153993424, archived from the original (PDF) on 2010-09-20
- Elvin, Mark (1973), The Pattern of the Chinese Past, Stanford University Press, ISBN 978-0-8047-0876-0
- Li, Bo; Zheng, Yin (2001), 5000 years of Chinese history (in Chinese), Inner Mongolian People's publishing corp, ISBN 978-7-204-04420-7
- Landes, David S. (2006). "Why Europe and the West? Why Not China?". The Journal of Economic Perspectives. 20 (2): 3–22. doi:10.1257/jep.20.2.3. JSTOR 30033648.
- Maddison, Angus (2007), Chinese economic performance in the long run, Organisation for Economic Co-operation and Development. Development Centre, ISBN 9789264037632
- Mao, Peiqi (2008), "明清易代与中国近代化的迟滞 (Ming-Qing transition and China's stagnation in the early modern period)", Hebei Academic Journal (in Chinese) (1): 72–75
- Myers, H. Ramon; Wang, Yeh-Chien (2002), "Economic developments, 1644–1800", in Peterson, Willard J. (ed.), Part One: The Ch'ing Empire to 1800, The Cambridge History of China, vol. 9, Cambridge: Cambridge University Press, pp. 563–647, ISBN 978-0-521-24334-6
- Rowe, William (2010), China's Last Empire - The Great Qing, Harvard University Press, ISBN 9780674054554
- Ni, Xing; Chen, Tao (2010), 中世纪城市革命"论说的提出和意义;基于"唐宋变革论"的考察 (Appearance and Significance on the Medieval Urban Revolution; A Review Based on the Tang-Song Transformation)
- Pomeranz, Kenneth (2000), The Great Divergence: China, Europe, and the Making of the Modern World Economy, Princeton University Press, ISBN 978-0-691-09010-8
- Xu, Suming (2005), "人学史观视阈下的中西大分流——对"为什么江南不是英国"之新思考 (The Great Divergence from a humanist perspective: Why was Jiangnan not England?)", Tianjin Social Science (in Chinese), 6
- Zhang, Xianqing (2008), "晚明：中国早期近代化的开端 (Late Ming: the beginning of China's modern era)", History of the Ming and Qing Dynasties (in Chinese) (5), archived from the original on July 16, 2011
