= Industrialization in China =

Industrialization in China refers to the process of China undergoing various stages of industrialization and technological revolutions. The focus is on the period after the founding of the People's Republic of China where China experienced its most notable transformation from a largely agrarian country to an industrialized powerhouse. Although the Chinese industrialization is largely defined by its 20th-century campaigns, especially those motivated by Mao Zedong's political calls to "exceed the UK and catch the USA", China has a long history that contextualizes the proto-industrial efforts, and explains the reasons for delay of industrialization in comparison to Western countries.

In 1952, 83 percent of the Chinese workforce were employed in agriculture. The figure remained high, but was declining steadily, throughout the early phase of industrialization between the 1960s and 1990s. In view of the rapid population growth, however, this amounted to a rapid growth of the industrial sector in absolute terms, of up to 11 percent per year during the period. By 1977, the fraction of the workforce employed in agriculture had fallen to about 77 percent, and by 2012, to 33 percent.

The two key factors behind Chinese industry's global rise are openness to the international economy and domestic market liberalization. China's current economic boom builds on liberalization efforts beginning in the late 1970s.

== Historical precursors of industrialization ==
In the State of Wu of China, steel was first made, preceding the Europeans by over 1,000 years. The Song dynasty saw intensive industry in steel production, and coal mining. No other premodern state advanced nearly as close to starting an industrial revolution as the Southern Song. The lack of potential customers for products manufactured by machines instead of artisans was due to the absence of a "middle class" in Song China which was the reason for the failure to industrialize.

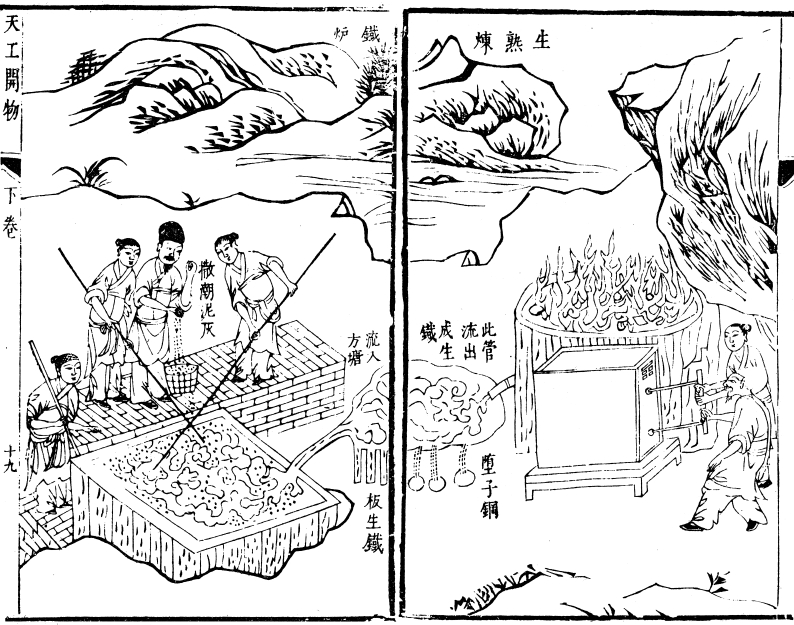
The puddling process of smelting iron ore to make wrought iron from pig iron, with the right illustration displaying men working a blast furnace, from the Tiangong Kaiwu encyclopedia, 1637

Western historians debate whether bloomery-based ironworking ever spread to China from the Middle East. In Wu, iron smelters achieved a temperature of 1130 °C, hot enough to be considered a blast furnace which could create cast iron. At this temperature, iron combines with 4.3% carbon and melts. As a liquid, iron can be cast into molds, a method far less laborious than individually forging each piece of iron from a bloom.

Cast iron is rather brittle and unsuitable for striking implements. It can, however, be decarburized to steel or wrought iron by heating it in air for several days. In China, these ironworking methods spread northward, and by 300 BC, iron was the material of choice throughout China for most tools and weapons. A mass grave in Hebei province, dated to the early 3rd century BC, contains several soldiers buried with their weapons and other equipment. The artifacts recovered from this grave are variously made of wrought iron, cast iron, malleabilized cast iron, and quench-hardened steel, with only a few, probably ornamental, bronze weapons.

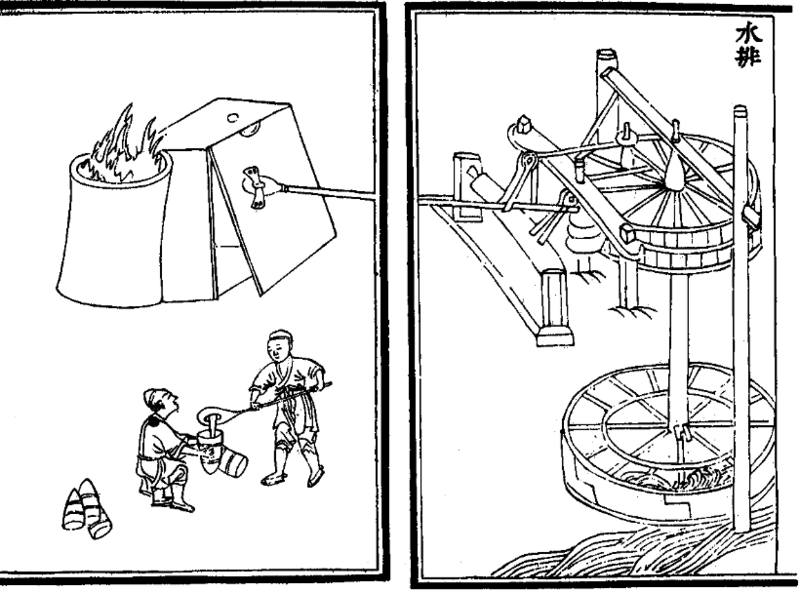
An illustration of furnace bellows operated by waterwheels, from the Nong Shu, by Wang Zhen, 1313 AD, during the Yuan dynasty in China

During the Han dynasty (202 BC–220 AD), the government established ironworking as a state monopoly (yet repealed during the latter half of the dynasty, returned to private entrepreneurship) and built a series of large blast furnaces in Henan province, each capable of producing several tons of iron per day. By this time, Chinese metallurgists had discovered how to puddle molten pig iron, stirring it in the open air until it lost its carbon and became wrought iron. (In Chinese, the process was called chao, literally, stir frying.) By the 1st century BC, Chinese metallurgists had found that wrought iron and cast iron could be melted together to yield an alloy of intermediate carbon content, that is, steel. According to legend, the sword of Liu Bang, the first Han emperor, was made in this fashion. Some texts of the era mention "harmonizing the hard and the soft" in the context of ironworking; the phrase may refer to this process. Also, the ancient city of Wan (Nanyang) from the Han period forward was a major center of the iron and steel industry. Along with their original methods of forging steel, the Chinese had also adopted the production methods of creating Wootz steel, an idea imported from India to China by the 5th century.

The Chinese during the ancient Han dynasty were also the first to apply hydraulic power (i.e. a waterwheel) in working the inflatable bellows of the blast furnace. This was recorded in the year 31 AD, an innovation of the engineer Du Shi, prefect of Nanyang. Although Du Shi was the first to apply water power to bellows in metallurgy, the first drawn and printed illustration of its operation with water power came in 1313, in the Yuan dynasty era text called the Nong Shu. In the 11th century, there is evidence of the production of steel in Song China using two techniques: a "berganesque" method that produced inferior, heterogeneous steel and a precursor to the modern Bessemer process that utilized partial decarbonization via repeated forging under a cold blast. By the 11th century, there was also a large amount of deforestation in China due to the iron industry's demands for charcoal. However, by this time the Chinese had figured out how to use bituminous coke to replace the use of charcoal, and with this switch in resources many acres of prime timberland in China were spared. This switch in resources from charcoal to coal was later used in Europe by the 17th century.

The economy of the Song dynasty was one of the most prosperous and advanced economies in the medieval world. Song Chinese invested their funds in joint stock companies and in multiple sailing vessels at a time when monetary gain was assured from the vigorous overseas trade and indigenous trade along the Grand Canal and Yangzi River. Prominent merchant families and private businesses were allowed to occupy industries that were not already government-operated monopolies. Both private and government-controlled industries met the needs of a growing Chinese population in the Song. Both artisans and merchants formed guilds which the state had to deal with when assessing taxes, requisitioning goods, and setting standard worker's wages and prices on goods.

The iron industry was pursued by both private entrepreneurs who owned their own smelters as well as government-supervised smelting facilities. The Song economy was stable enough to produce over a hundred million kg (over two hundred million lb) of iron product a year. Large scale deforestation in China would have continued if not for the 11th-century innovation of the use of coal instead of charcoal in blast furnaces for smelting cast iron. Much of this iron was reserved for military use in crafting weapons and armoring troops, but some was used to fashion the many iron products needed to fill the demands of the growing indigenous market. The iron trade within China was furthered by the building of new canals which aided the flow of iron products from production centers to the large market found in the capital city.

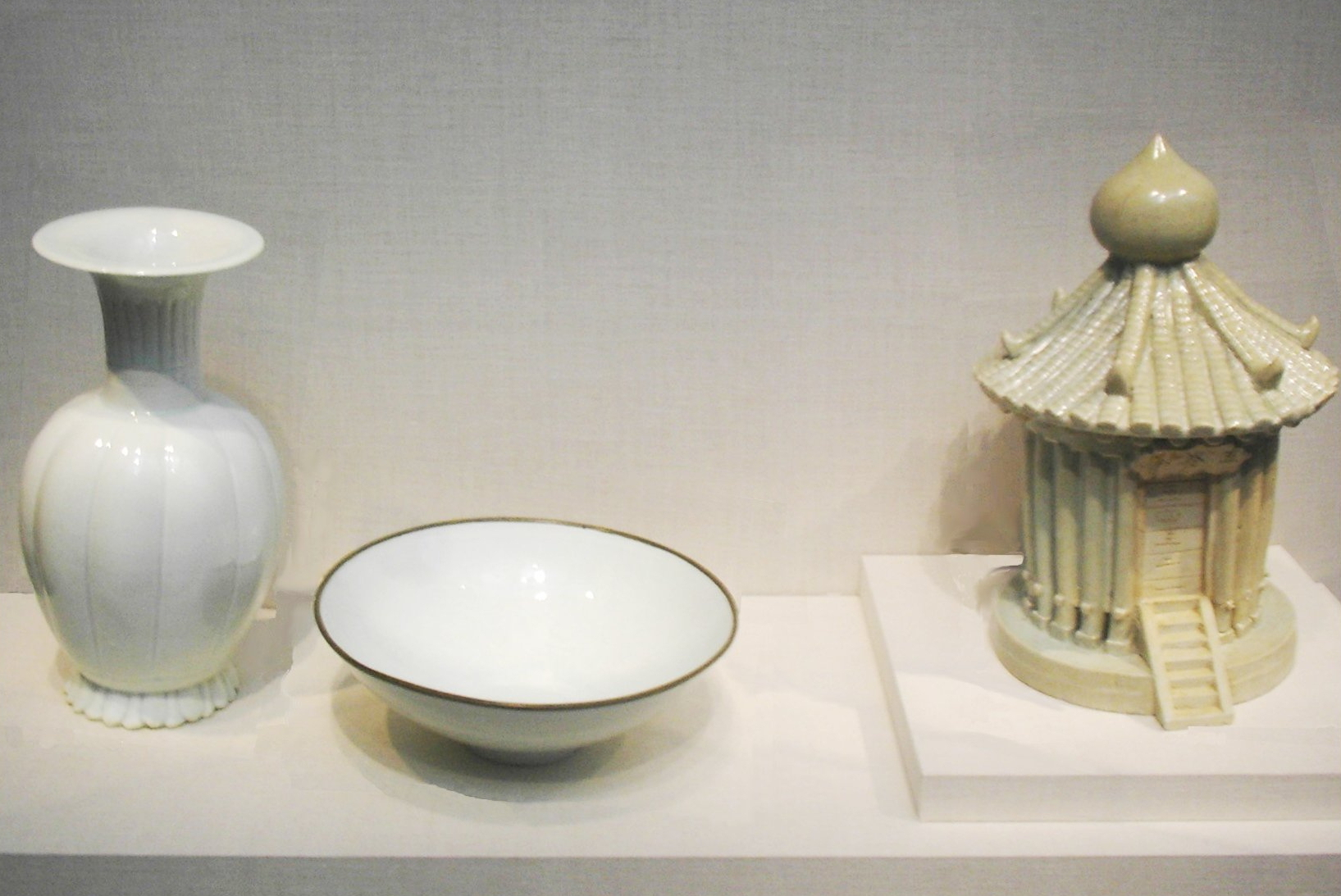
Left item: A Northern Song qingbai-ware vase with a transparent blue-toned ceramic glaze, from Jingdezhen, 11th century; Center item: A Northern or Southern Song qingbai-ware bowl with incised lotus decorations, a metal rim, and a transparent blue-toned glaze, from Jingdezhen, 12th or 13th century; Right item: A Southern Song miniature model of a storage granary with removable top lid and doorway, qingbai porcelain with transparent blue-toned glaze, Jingdezhen, 13th century.

The annual output of minted copper currency in 1085 alone reached roughly six billion coins. The most notable advancement in the Song economy was the establishment of the world's first government issued paper-printed money, known as Jiaozi (see also Huizi). For the printing of paper money alone, the Song court established several government-run factories in the cities of Huizhou, Chengdu, Hangzhou, and Anqi. The size of the workforce employed in paper money factories was large; it was recorded in 1175 that the factory at Hangzhou employed more than a thousand workers a day.

The economic power of Song China heavily influenced foreign economies abroad. The Moroccan geographer al-Idrisi wrote in 1154 of the prowess of Chinese merchant ships in the Indian Ocean and of their annual voyages that brought iron, swords, silk, velvet, porcelain, and various textiles to places such as Aden (Yemen), the Indus River, and the Euphrates in modern-day Iraq. Foreigners, in turn, affected the Chinese economy. For example, many West Asian and Central Asian Muslims went to China to trade, becoming a preeminent force in the import and export industry, while some were even appointed as officers supervising economic affairs. Sea trade with the Southeast Pacific, the Hindu world, the Islamic world, and the East African world brought merchants great fortune and spurred an enormous growth in the shipbuilding industry of Song-era Fujian province. However, there was risk involved in such long overseas ventures. To reduce the risk of losing money on maritime trade missions abroad, the historians Ebrey, Walthall, and Palais write:

[Song era] investors usually divided their investment among many ships, and each ship had many investors behind it. One observer thought eagerness to invest in overseas trade was leading to an outflow of copper cash. He wrote, 'People along the coast are on intimate terms with the merchants who engage in overseas trade, either because they are fellow-countrymen or personal acquaintances...[They give the merchants] money to take with them on their ships for purchase and return conveyance of foreign goods. They invest from ten to a hundred strings of cash, and regularly make profits of several hundred percent'.

== Reasons for the delay in industrialization ==
There is by no means a definitive theory on why, in spite of having some favorable conditions for industrialization, China still experienced a substantial delay. Some historians such as David Landes and Max Weber credit the different belief systems in China and Europe with dictating where the revolution occurred. The religion and beliefs of Europe were largely products of Christianity, Socrates, Plato, and Aristotle. Conversely, Chinese society was founded on men like Confucius, Mencius, Han Feizi (Legalism), Lao Tzu (Taoism), and Buddha (Buddhism). The key difference between these belief systems was that those from Europe focused on the individual, while Chinese beliefs centered around relationships between people. The family unit was more important than the individual for the large majority of Chinese history, and this may have played a role in why the Industrial Revolution took much longer to occur in China. Further scholarship, such as that of Joel Makyr suggests that one of the main driving forces that led to Europe industrializing sooner than China was a culture of interstate competition. Because China was the regional hegemonic power there was no large threat from the 17th century onwards. In Europe, where there was no clear hegemonic power, the power struggle created a competition model which allowed for economic, cultural, and technological progress that was unseen in China. Other factors include a Chinese culture of status-quo stability, meaning that revolutionary new ideas which called into question the historical or cultural narrative of China were largely suppressed, meaning there was little space for innovation comparable to Europe.

=== The English school ===
By contrast, there is a historical school which Jack Goldstone has dubbed the "English school" which argues that China was not essentially different from Europe, and that many of the assertions that it was are based on bad historical evidence.

Mark Elvin argues that China was in a high-level equilibrium trap in which the non-industrial methods were efficient enough to prevent use of industrial methods with high initial capital. Kenneth Pomeranz, in the Great Divergence, argues that Europe and China were remarkably similar in 1700, and that the crucial differences which created the Industrial Revolution in Europe were sources of coal near manufacturing centers, and raw materials such as food and wood from the New World, which allowed Europe to expand economically in a way that China could not.

Some have compared England directly to China, but the comparison between England and China has been viewed as a faulty one, since China is so much larger than England. A more relevant comparison would be between China's Yangtze Delta region, China's most advanced region, the location of Hangzhou, Nanjing and contemporary Shanghai, and England. This region of China is said to have had similar labor costs to England. According to Andre Gunder Frank, "Particularly significant is the comparison of Asia's 66 percent share of world population, confirmed above all by estimates for 1750, with its 80 percent share of production in the world at the same time. So, two thirds of the world's people in Asia produced four-fifths of total world output, while one-fifth of world population in Europe produced only a part of the remaining one-fifth share of world production, to which Europeans and Americans also contributed."

== Industrialization of the People's Republic of China ==
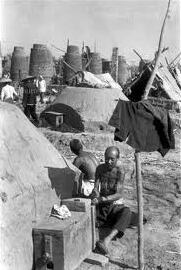
Small scale industrial efforts such as home and community metallurgy and steel production were common in the Great Leap Forward. Pictured is a man tending to his backyard steel furnace.

The Chinese Civil War devastated the country's economy. With a United States economic embargo against the recently-established People's Republic of China (PRC), the Eastern Bloc countries were the PRC's only source of foreign economic, material, and technical support. The PRC pursued a policy of rapid industrialization relying primarily on its domestic resources.

Beginning in 1953 Mao introduced a 'Five Year Plan' reminiscent of Soviet industrialization efforts. This five-year plan would signify the People's Republic of China first large scale campaign to industrialize. Drawing heavily from Soviet success, the plan was characterized by intense collectivization and economic centralization. Soviet assistance was crucial in this undertaking, China "received the most advanced technology available within the Soviet Union, and in some cases this was the best in the world". Several thousand Soviet Technical advisors went on to oversee and guide 156 industrial projects. Soviet assistance during this stage constituted about half of industrial production and development. Because of Soviet assisted development, agricultural and industrial output value grew from 30% in 1949 to 56.5% in 1957, and heavy industry saw similar growth from 26.4% to 48.4%. Therefore, the Soviet assistance in kickstarting industrialization was a key component in the larger process of Chinese industrialization, and economic development as a whole. The Maoist Great Leap Forward (simplified Chinese: 大跃进; traditional Chinese: 大躍進; pinyin: Dàyuèjìn) was the plan used from 1958 to 1961 to transform the People's Republic of China from a primarily agrarian economy by peasant farmers into a modern communist society through the process of agriculturalization and industrialization. Mao Zedong anticipated agriculture and industry (shorthand 'grain and steel') as the foundations of any economic progress or national strengthening. Thus, The Great Leap forward heavily relied on and lent attention to these two sectors to establish a strong economic base from which further developments could originate. Ideological motivations for this transformation are widely varied. Chinese experience of foreign occupation had widespread effects on the national mentality, compelling leaders to establish a strong, autonomous and self sufficient state. A primary factor however was Cold War cultural, and economic competition with the West. Hearing of the Soviet Union's plan to surpass the United States in industrial output, Mao Zedong claimed "Comrade Khrushchev has told us, the Soviet Union 15 years later will surpass the United States of America. I can also say, 15 years later, we may catch up with or exceed the UK." Mao Zedong based this program on the Theory of Productive Forces. The Great Leap Forward ended in catastrophe, high volumes of resources were directed to the industrial projects of the campaign. When the industrial projects failed to produce the expected output, there was a lack of resources including tools, farming equipment and infrastructure upon which the agricultural sector was relying upon. In conjunction with widespread drought towards the end of the period, a widespread famine occurred. The overall result of the Great Leap Forward was an actual, albeit temporary, shrinking of the Chinese economy. However, from 1952 to 1978 GDP per capita grew at an average rate of 3.6%, outpacing inflation. Another trend from The Great Leap Forward was the steady decline of those employed in the agricultural sector, as the industrial sector grew. Furthermore, as China began to rely more heavily on industrial output, the value added to the GDP by agriculture also declined, going from 70% in 1952, to 30% in 1977. During this time period several notable industries within China experienced significant growth in their annual production: annual steel production grew from 1.3 million tons to 23 million tons, coal grew from 66 million tons to 448 million tons, electric power generation increased from 7 million to 133 billion kilowatt-hours, and cement production rose from 3 million to 49 million tons per year.

As political stability was gradually restored following the Cultural Revolution of the late 1960s, a renewed drive for coordinated, balanced development was set in motion under the leadership of Premier Zhou Enlai. To revive efficiency in industry, Chinese Communist Party committees were returned to positions of leadership over the revolutionary committees, and a campaign was carried out to return skilled and highly educated personnel to the jobs from which they had been displaced during the Cultural Revolution. Universities began to reopen, and foreign contacts were expanded. Once again the economy suffered from imbalances in the capacities of different industrial sectors and an urgent need for increased supplies of modern inputs for agriculture. In response to these problems, there was a significant increase in investment, including the signing of contracts with foreign firms for the construction of major facilities for chemical fertilizer production, steel finishing, and oil extraction and refining. The most notable of these contracts was for thirteen of the world's largest and most modern chemical fertilizer plants. During this period, industrial output grew at an average rate of 11 percent a year.

At the milestone Third Plenum of the National Party Congress's 11th Central Committee which opened on December 22, 1978, the party leaders decided to undertake a program of gradual but fundamental reform of the economic system. They concluded that the Maoist version of the centrally planned economy had failed to produce efficient economic growth and had caused China to fall far behind not only the industrialized nations of the West but also the new industrial powers of Asia: Japan, South Korea, Singapore, Taiwan, and Hong Kong. In the late 1970s, while Japan and Hong Kong rivaled European countries in modern technology, China's citizens had to make do with barely sufficient food supplies, rationed clothing, inadequate housing, and a service sector that was inadequate and inefficient. All of these shortcomings embarrassed China internationally.

The purpose of the reform program was not to abandon communism but to make it work better by substantially increasing the role of market mechanisms in the system and by reducing—not eliminating—government planning and direct control. The process of reform was incremental. New measures were first introduced experimentally in a few localities and then were popularized and disseminated nationally if they proved successful. By 1987 the program had achieved remarkable results in increasing supplies of food and other consumer goods and had created a new climate of dynamism and opportunity in the economy. At the same time, however, the reforms also had created new problems and tensions, leading to intense questioning and political struggles over the program's future.

The first few years of the reform program were designated the "period of readjustment," during which key imbalances in the economy were to be corrected and a foundation was to be laid for a well-planned modernization drive. The schedule of Hua Guofeng's ten-year plan was discarded, although many of its elements were retained. The major goals of the readjustment process were to expand exports rapidly; overcome key deficiencies in transportation, communications, coal, iron, steel, building materials, and electric power; and redress the imbalance between light and heavy industry by increasing the growth rate of light industry and reducing investment in heavy industry.

In 1984, the fourteen largest coastal cities were designated as economic development zones, including Dalian, Tianjin, Shanghai, and Guangzhou, all of which were major commercial and industrial centers. These zones were to create productive exchanges between foreign firms with advanced technology and major Chinese economic networks.

China has continued its rise as an industrial power to the present day. It is now the leading industrial power in the world in terms of output, in 2016 producing $4.566 trillion worth of industrial yield. This rapid increase, is in large part attributed to a number of factors. Opening sectors of the industrial economy to foreign investment and privatization, the introduction of the stock market in Shanghai, increasing export markets, outsourcing of manufacturing into China, and the entry of China into the World Trade Organization.

While Chinese industrial output is still dominant in the world, it has experienced stagnation. Declining in the late 1990s, it reached its low point of 7% in 1998 (industrial output index) and reached 23% in 2004. Since then, it has largely declined and stagnated in the 2010s, hovering between 5-10%. Much of this downturn can be attributed to lower demand as a response to the Chinese stock market crash. In response, in 2016 China announced its plans to downsize its steel and coal industries and lay off 15% of the respective workforce. Part of this larger trend can be attributed to China's movement away from heavy industry, and into light industry such as the production of consumer goods for the world market. China has also seen growth in other sectors such as construction, technology, finance, and energy which can be attributed to a decreased reliance on industry.

== Environmental implications ==
Like previous industrialization campaigns, Chinese industrialization brought modern economic development and a general increase in quality of life for many of its citizens, while also introducing a variety of environmental implications that can be felt locally, and on a global scale. Academic Stevan Harrell observes that the environmental consequences of the PRC's industrialization during the Mao era were comparable to "industrial capitalism at the same state of capital accumulation."

From 1985 to 2008, the quantities of energy production grew by 203.9%, while the energy consumption increased by 271.7%. Along with those increases, the emissions of industrial wastewater, gas and solid waste have undergone massive growth. Environmental accidents all over the country have also increased in recent years. "It is reported that the number of environmental disasters in 2010 was as double as that of 2009, and there were 102 accidents in the first half of 2010."

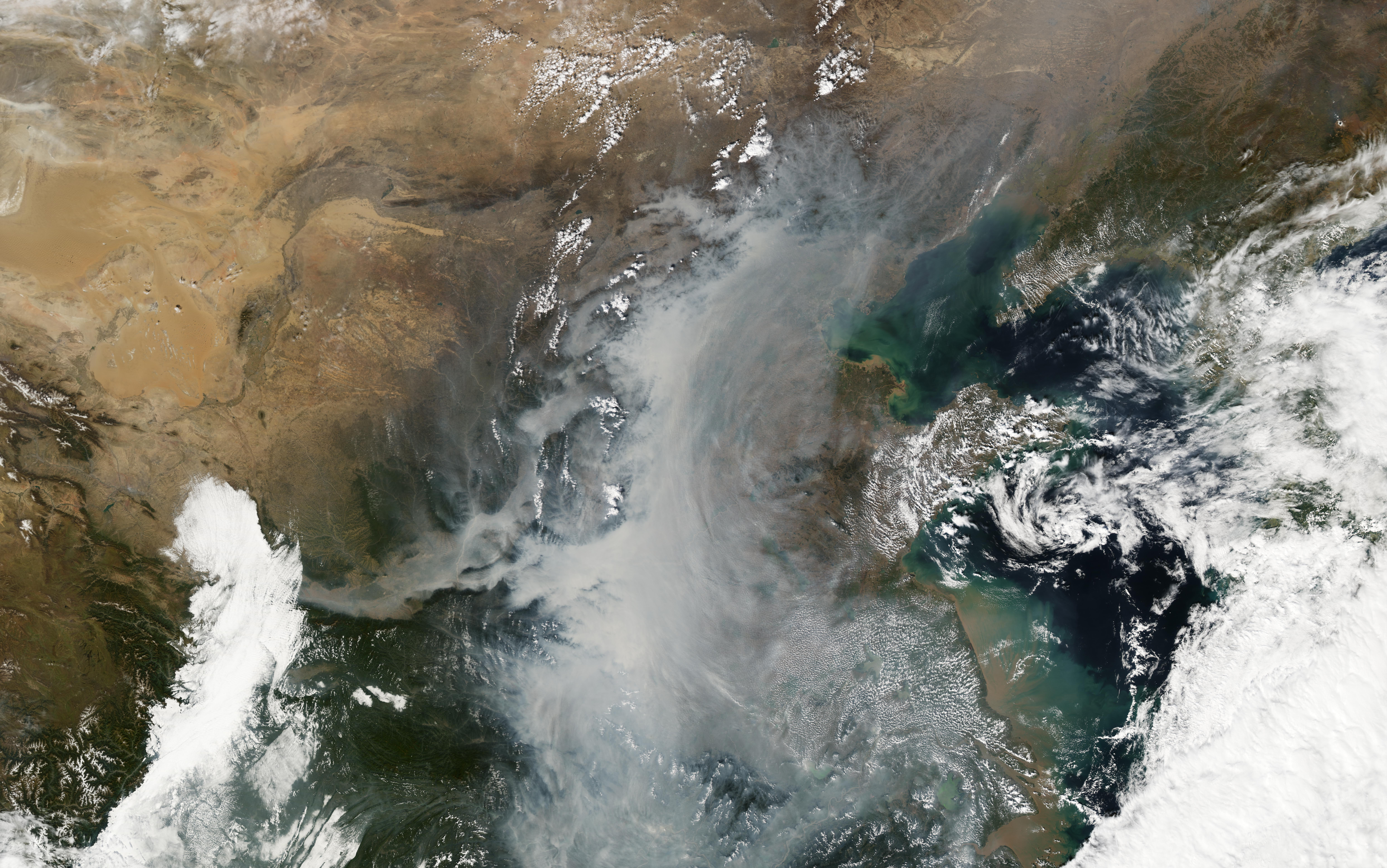
A blanket of smog covering northeast China, home to most of Chinese industrialization

=== Air pollutants ===
==== CO_{2} ====
China faces a problem with air quality as a consequence of industrialization. China ranks as the second largest consumer of oil in the world, and "China is the world's top coal producer, consumer, and importer, and accounts for almost half of global coal consumption.", as such their CO_{2} emissions reflect the usage and production of fossil fuels. As of 2015, China has been ranked the number one CO_{2} contributor holding 29% of the global CO_{2} emissions. In 2012, the World Resources Institute figured the total global carbon emission to be 33.84 billion tons where China contributed to 9.31 billion. In particular, biomass forest burning and shrubland, grassland, and crop residue fire burning are some of the most important contributors to China's CO_{2} emission. Agriculture is also another top contributor to carbon emission in China representing 17% of the total emissions. And, China's steel industry has accounted for 44% of the total CO_{2} emissions. China's industries are not the only determinate of air pollution; China's growing population has increased heavy traffic and power generation. Altogether, China's growing infrastructure has created 3.28 billion tons of industrial waste from 2013 to 2016. On a local level, China has implemented a pollution warning system that notifies citizens of the day to day air quality and potential health effects. The highest warning: red, indicates an unsuitability for all outdoor activity because of health risks. Certain measures have been adopted to curb the production of smog and haze within China such as temporary vehicle bans. Additionally as smog and haze threats grow, the Chinese Ministry of Environmental Protection has called upon the steel producing cities of Linyi and Chengde to curb pollution from a result of the steel industry, by enforcing environmental laws or by closing down some thirteen offender's factories.

=== Water pollutants ===
==== Huai River Basin Within the Shandong Province Case Study ====
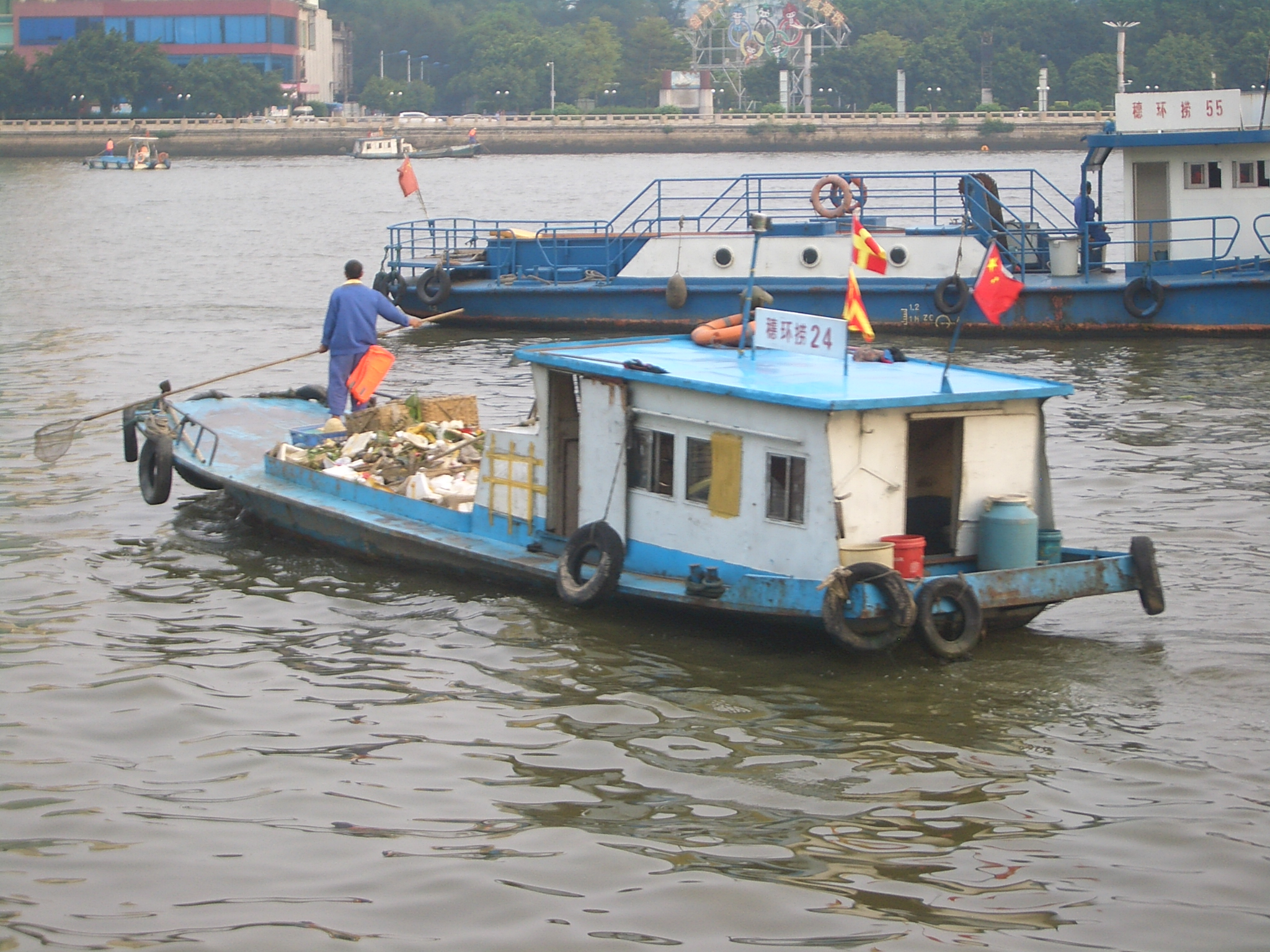
A trash picking boat, removing waste from the Pearl River in southern China which receives high amounts of trash and industrial pollution from the major industrial center of Guangzhou and surrounding towns

The Huai River Basin is located between the Yangtze River and the Yellow River and contains 42 counties. The Huai River Basin within Shandong covers an area of 47100 km^{2} including the Nansi Lake Basin and Yishi River Basin.

With the growing infrastructure from industrialization, urbanization, and the growth of megacities in China, there are numerous pollutants that are decreasing the water quality and have contaminated many groundwater aquifers. A study on the causes of pollutants on the Huai River Basin within the Shandong province analyzed which of these industries caused the most wastewater to determine the direct effects of industrialization in the HRBSP. Different industries that emit these pollutants in the region were classified into different levels for their environmental impact. Coal, papermaking, and construction material were classified as high-energy-consumption/low-output value/high-pollution industries. Textiles, petrochemicals, and electric power were classified as high-energy-consumption/ high-output value/high pollution industries. Lastly, medical manufacturing and mechanical scores were classified as low-energy-consumption/high-output value/low-pollutant industries. The study concluded that the top contributors to water pollutants were the food processing industry, 23.55% COD and 26.05% NH_{3}-N, the papermaking industry, 28.47% COD and 18.72% NH_{3}-N, and the petrochemical industry, 15.34% COD and 25.52% NH_{3}-N.

Since 2010, China's Prevention and Control of Water Pollution and the Eleventh Five-Year Plan of the Huai River Basin have set water quality requirements to level III meaning the water quality is clean enough for human consumption and recreation. Because the Huai River Basin includes four-prefecture-level cities, Zaozhuang, Jinan, Linyi, and Heze, there is high pressure for meeting the required water quality standards. Of the 27 monitoring sites in this case study, the Huai River Basin's water quality was graded IV, where water quality is not suitable for human consumption or recreation, at 10 monitoring sites and graded V, where water quality it extremely polluted and unsuitable for any use, in the Xiangzimio region. Even though the water quality at these sites have slightly improved, the Eastern Route of the South-to-North Water Division Project, who manages the water quality of the Huai River Basin, are still in their developing stages and have struggled to maintain a balance between industrialization and water quality due to the rate of China's growing industrial activities.

=== Desertification ===
Desertification remains a serious problem, consuming an area greater than the area used as farmland. Over 2.95 million hectares, or 57% of its territory, had been affected by desertification. Although desertification has been curbed in some areas, it is still expanding at a rate of more than 67 km^{2} every year. 90% of China's desertification occurs in the west of the country. Approximately 30% of China's current surface area is considered desert. China's rapid industrialization could cause this area to drastically increase. The Gobi Desert to the north currently expands by about 950 square miles (2,500 km^{2}) per year. The vast plains in northern China used to be regularly flooded by the Yellow River. However, overgrazing and the expansion of agricultural land could cause this area to increase.

=== Health risks ===
Pollutants emitted into the air and water by China's rapid industrialization has brought major health concerns. The anthropogenic activities in China have decreased food safety and antibiotic resistance and have increased resurging infectious diseases. Air pollution, alone, is directly linked to increased risk of lung cancer, breast cancer, and bladder cancer and has already led to more than 1.3 million premature deaths in China and linked to 1.6 million deaths a year - 17% of all annual Chinese deaths. 92% of Chinese have had at least 120 annual hours of unhealthy air determined by EPA standards. As the World Health Organization states hazardous air is more deadly than AIDS, malaria, breast cancer, or tuberculosis, than Chinese air quality is especially problematic because of the scale at which it occurs.

While farmable land in China is slim to begin with, the Ministry of Land and Resources reported that China has contaminated 33.3 million hectares of farmland that cannot be used for any constructive purpose. Consequently, China is faced with increased exposure to new pathogens that threaten public health as a result migrating wildlife from these dead zones.

== See also ==
- Agriculture in China
- Dependency theory
- Economy of China
- Economic history of China (Pre-1911)
- Economic history of China (1912–1949)
- Great Divergence
- Industry of China
- Industrial history of China
- Industrial Revolution
- Industrialization
- International inequality
- Modernization
- Science and technology in China
- Self-Strengthening Movement (1861–1895)
- Sino-German cooperation (1911–1941)
