= Economy of the Qing dynasty =

A map of the Qing dynasty in the 18th century

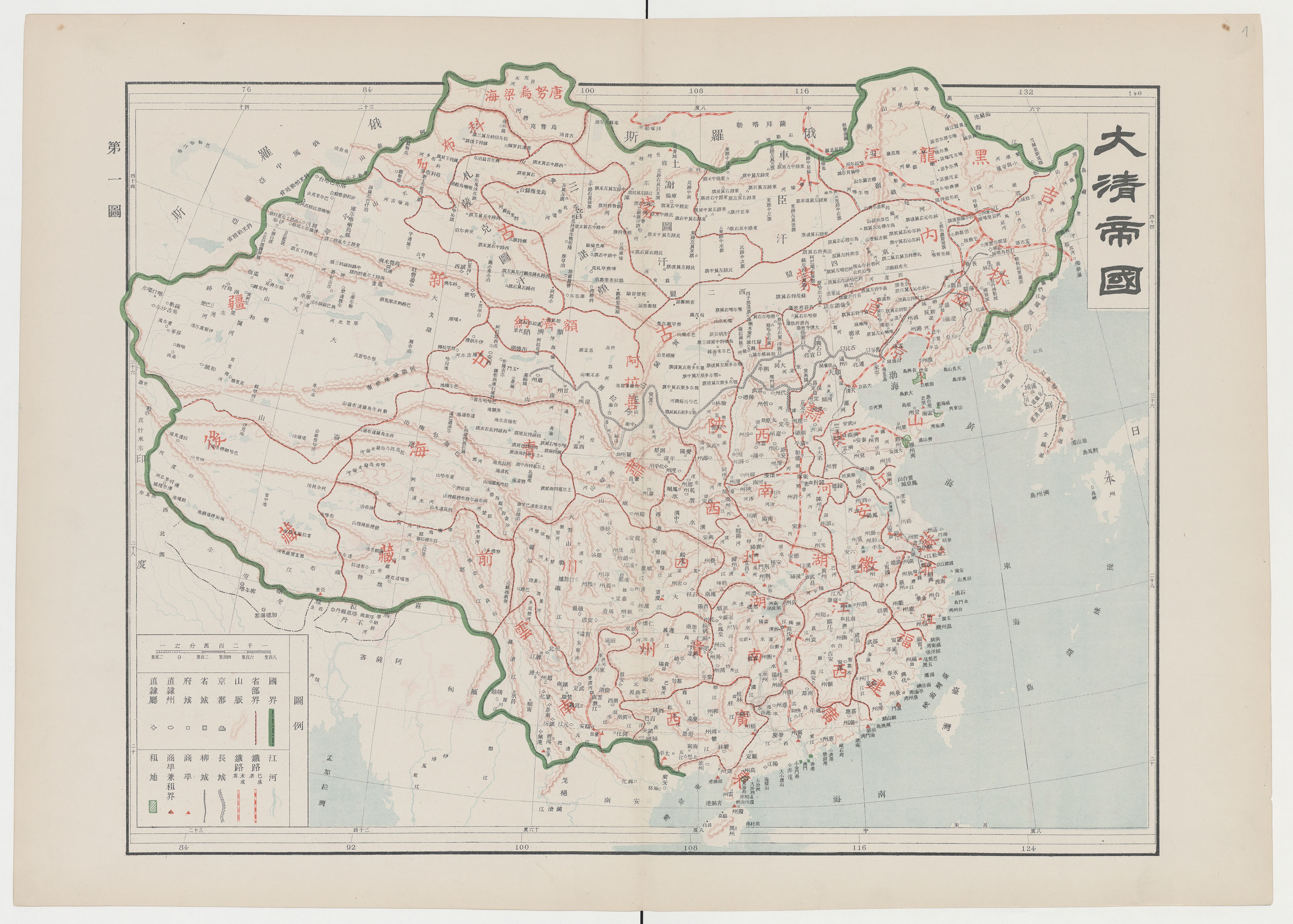
Official map of the empire published by the Qing dynasty in 1905.

The Qing dynasty (1644–1912) was the most populated country on Earth for nearly two centuries and had a large and varied economy. The High Qing era saw a period of rapid demographic and economic growth, followed by a near century of stagnation brought about by the unequal treaties, rebellions, floods, and a fiscally conservative and decentralised government.

The period up to the High Qing era has been described by scholars as a second commercial revolution, even more transformative than the first, which occurred during the Song dynasty. By the end of the 18th century a "circulation economy" or "commodity economy" developed, in which commercialization penetrated local rural society to an unprecedented degree. During this period the European trend of imitating Chinese artistic traditions, known as chinoiserie, gained great popularity in Europe in the 18th century due to the rise in trade with China and the broader current of Orientalism.

== Agriculture ==
Due to the mid-century rebellions there is a distinct lack of data in the latter half of the Late Qing era. This has therefore led to a great reliance on estimates of production and a reduction to general trends over specific numbers. However, the population largely remained close to 400,000,000 throughout the 1800s and early 1900s with a significant decrease during the mid-century era due to rebellions, floods, famines and other issues.

The Qing dynasty controlled a large portion of Asia including areas beyond modern China, and so its agriculture was widely varied. General trends, however, can be identified, namely that Southern China (generally south of the Yangtze river) produced rice and North of the river produced wheat. Further provincial staples and agricultural patterns are also identifiable; generally Guangxi and Guangdong specialised in double-cropping of rice, with Zhejiang, Hunan and Jiangxi producing rice and tea. Jiangsu, Anhui and Hubei in contrast produced both rice and wheat, with wheat being grown in the winter. Shandong, Henan and Zhili (Hebei) produced winter wheat and kaoliang. Shaanxi and Shanxi in addition to Eastern Gansu and South Ningxia produced winter wheat too alongside millet, Manchuria produced soybeans and kaoliang with Sichuan, Yunnan and Guizhou producing rice. Inner and Outer Mongolia was predominantly pasture land, while Xinjiang was reliant on oases for agriculture. Likewise, in Tibet agriculture was predominantly in valleys, with the remainder used for pasture.

The peasants often grew multiple different types of crops, and varied their activities. In less arable areas, the peasantry adapted by growing most of their own grain as annual crops while legumes were grown as semi-annual crops, while also producing handicraft goods or working as labourers wherever possible to supplement their income. As peace and prosperity continued throughout the 18th century the populace increasingly diversified in roles. In the more arable and productive areas in Northern China families grew multiple crops a year, generally one food and one industrial crop such as cotton and mulberry. In Southern China the productive lands often grew two food crops, one of which was retained for subsistence and the other sold. Alternatively, they followed the above North China regime of one food crop and one industrial crop. In the far south of China the custom was three crops: two of rice and one of wheat or beans.

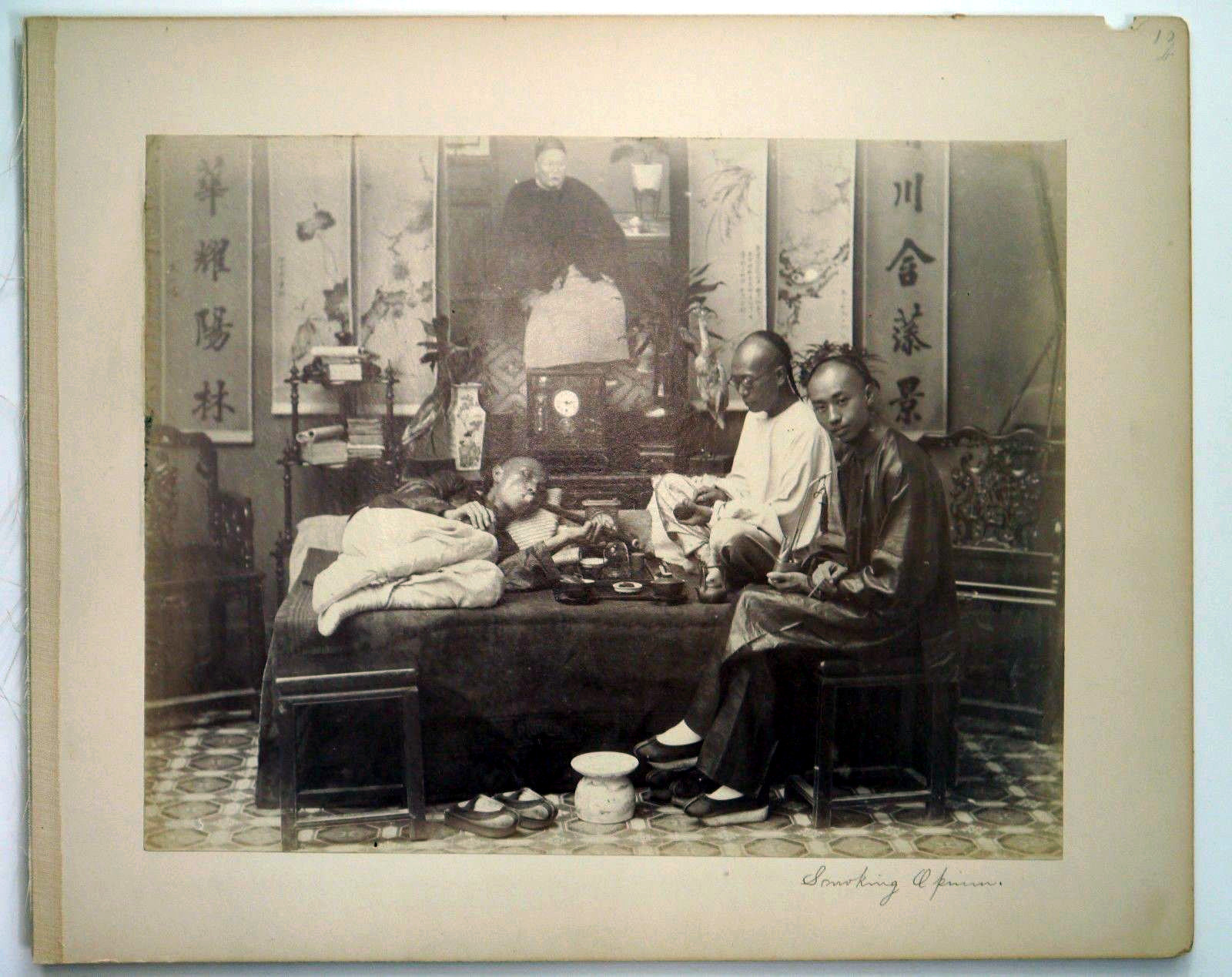
Opium smokers whose demand for the drug created a considerable increase in production of the poppy domestically.

Generally, the Qing Emperors discouraged the production of non-grain crops, believing them to be immoral and simultaneously causing food shortages. Though tobacco was not banned, the Yongzheng Emperor stated to the Grand Council that its cultivation was harmful, and even contemplated introducing agricultural supervisory bodies nation-wide to encourage 'correct' agriculture. Though this plan was never implemented, the Emperor did disparage the wasting of grain especially using it to feed livestock.

=== Agricultural productivity ===
The Qing intelligentsia recognised the weakness of the Qing methods of agriculture compared the prosperous agriculture of Europe, which fed more people with less land and far fewer laborers than China. They argued in favour of mechanisation and modernised farming techniques. This desire for modernisation was repeated by officials such as Zhang Zhidong, who noted that China already had issues of food supply and that the nation was overpopulated. His solution was chemistry, in the form of fertiliser, which he theorised would allow China to support 300% its current population of 400,000,000 amounting to over 1,200,000,000, a figure lower than China's population today.

=== Population pressure ===
Throughout the Qing period there was an immense increase in population, which placed an extraordinary pressure on the land to both provide work and feed the people. In 1873-1893 alone the population rose by 8% while cultivated land rose by only 1%. Accordingly, land plots decreased in size; however there was not a corresponding fall in living standards or an increase in poverty simultaneously. The entire 1800s was a long period of stagnation for the agricultural sector; to continue feeding a growing population on the land, there was a shift to more calorie-dense and correspondingly labour-intensive crops rather than any technological, agricultural or institutional reform or improvement. The total food output of major food crops was in excess of 2,000,000,000 piculs or 120,957,964 tonnes an amount capable of providing food for the entire nation. The large labour surplus of China applied for successive centuries if not millennia allowed for a large yield per unit for rice it stood at 2.3 tons/hectare in the 1600s. In contrast, India had only achieved 1.36 tons/hectare by the 1960s, and China in the same period had only risen to 2.5 tons/hectare, a negligible increase per unit. These impressive units however disguise the fact that the vast majority of the 2.3 tons were the food for the farmers who grew it (who numbered far more than in other parts of the world), and little was left for the market. This limited excess of food combined with a high demand for labour due to intensive agricultural methods meant that industrialisation was hindered and slowed.

There were signs of demographic strain as the number of marriages and births declined in the early 19th century. Additionally, many of the inhabitants of the overcrowded regions migrated to other areas of China particularly the upper Yellow and Yangtze regions, which exacerbated tensions leading to the White Lotus Rebellion as well as soil depletion, land degradation and flooding. This flooding was a result of deforestation, as maize farming proved too intense and dense for the local soils to accommodate.

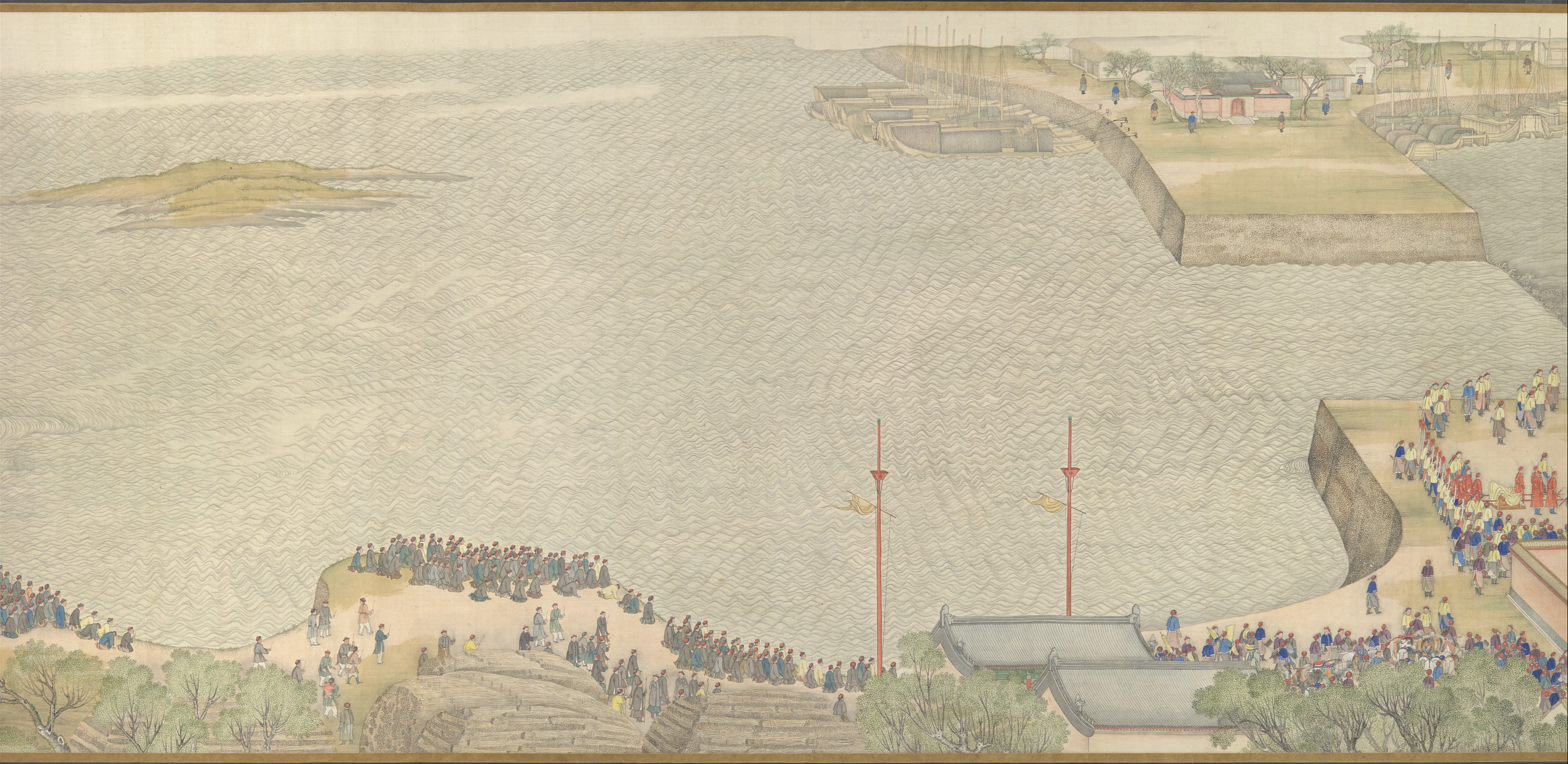
The confluence of the Huai and Yellow Rivers both were important sources of irrigation and vital for agriculture in the North China Plain.

=== Agricultural trade ===
Tea access to which was a key factor in the Opium wars ceased to be the dominant export crop of China in 1887 being overtaken by silk, as both raw and refined silk exports increased throughout the dynasty. China also increasingly exported raw cotton as its domestic yarn industry was outpriced by cheap yarn from the factories of Japan and India. This reduced demand for yarn and therefore demand for cotton in China, as well as increasing prices for raw cotton internationally, increasing its demand abroad. However, the largest growth in cultivation was that of opium. Though there is no national data that exists in regard to this growth of cultivation, it was recorded that opium imports fell in quantity throughout the Late Qing period. Sir Robert Hart of the Imperial Maritime Customs Service estimated total production to be 334,000 piculs which is over 2,000 tonnes. Edkins also notes that the customs service recorded 12,600 piculs passing Yichang in 1894 and 22,000 in 1897 a considerable increase in only 3 years and 400 piculs less opium is imported annually at the port of Zhenjiang acorrding to the commissioner of the city.

Domestically, the movement of foodstuffs was widespread. The coastal areas of Hubei, Shanxi and Zhili imported food from the rest of China and by the early 1800s the value of the domestic trade of foodstuffs was over 168,000,000 taels annually, an amount 3 times that of the grain tax.

=== Regionalism and Centralisation ===
Despite the 1700s seeing a large tendency towards national market integration, with Jiangnan being the focal point of wealth by the 19th century the tendency swung back towards economic regionalisation. Rather than surplus labour being applied to already-farmed plots and thereby boosting vertical productivity, untilled land became cleared and settled especially in the frontier regions. Beyond Jiangnan, agricultural productivity did not increase. In Northern China cash crop production fell, as the growing population raised the demand for food. This return to subsistence agriculture reversed previous trends towards a market economy, and the urban population largely declined as the rural population thus boomed. The rate of urbanisation reached 5%, half that of the Southern Song dynasty.

Jiangnan's chief trade of cloth was soon displaced as Hubei began exchanging its cotton for food from Sichuan, leading to a Sichuanese cloth industry undermining Jiangnan. The decline of Jiangnan's ability to export goods also affected its ability in turn to purchase goods from other provinces.

== Industry and trade ==
The late Qing routinely ran a trade deficit only reversed by the remittances of overseas Chinese and spending of foreigners without which from the entire period 1865-1911 there would be a deficit with a trade deficit in 1905 amounted to almost the entirety of the value of Qing exports this outflow of capital was not conducive or indicative of a developing economy which traditionally rely on the export of goods.

Balance of payments of the Late Qing (taels)
year	imports	exports	Remittances	Foreign spending	Balance
1865	55,700,00	54,100,00	50,000,000		+48,400,000
1875	67,800,000	68,900,000	50,000,000		+51,100,000
1885	88,200,000	65,000,000	50,000,000		+26,800,000
1895	171,000,000	143,300,000	50,000,000	30,000,000	+52,300,000
1905	447,100,000	227,900,000	50,000,000	12,500,000	-156,700,000
1911	471,500,000	377,300,000	50,000,000	12,500,000	-31,700,000

=== Banking ===
==== Foreign banks ====
The modern system of banking a key driver in providing capital to modern economic ventures was entirely absent in China prior to 1850 with British banks such as HSBC (and its predecessors) and the Oriental Banking company maintaining a monopoly on modern Chinese banking until the Germans established the Deutsch-Asiatische bank in 1889 the other countries soon followed however the Chinese did not establish their own banks until 1898. The foreign banks however were much more varied in their roles than their role as banks would allow them to be in Europe, they acted as representatives of their governmental treasuries, took deposits of the Chinese maritime customs service and the salt tax used as securities for foreign loans, as well as issuing bank notes despite a lack of permission from the Qing government citing their extraterritorial right to do so being the only reliable banks for decades the foreign banks became extremely wealthy and powerful with over 35,000,000 taels worth of bank notes in circulation with high estimates placing circulation at 300,000,000.

==== Chinese banks ====
During the Hundred days reform the Guangxu emperor approved the formation of a government sponsored private bank, this was the Commercial bank of China with 5,000,000 taels. In 1905 it was joined by the Hubu (later Da Qing) bank with 10,000,000 taels and in 1907 the Bank of Communications the number of banks thus proliferated with 59 by 1914 this growing banking industry though not useful to the Qing, they would prove instrumental to the subsequent warlords and the Nanjing government.

== Daoguang Depression ==
The reign of the Daoguang Emperor (r. 1820–1850) saw a prolonged period of economic depression within the Qing Dynasty, the primary expression of this depression was in steep deflation as prices and wages fell precpitiously. In Hebei agricultural prices fell by 40% from 1820 to 1850 before recovering by 1844 handicraft goods fell by a smaller 30% wages however fell by over 40%. This pattern of deflation was not isolated to Hebei as in Beijing wages fell by 25% from 1823 to 1838 in terms of silver. This steep deflation in terms of silver depressed the entirety of the economy, this has predominantly been explained by the reversal of the silver exchange from a surplus to a deficit brought about by the large-scale importation of opium which resulted in an outflow of nearly 134,000,000 pesos in the reign of Daoguang. This view however has recently been challenged as the Opium trade only accounted for less than half of the exportation of opium and rather that the rising price of silver internationally lead to the outflow of silver and that when silver prices fell in 1857 the exchange once again reversed and silver once again entered the Qing economy despite a larger scale of opium importation.

The bronze coin also suffered severe deflation and given this was a larger component of the rural economy this had the most severe effects as the adulteration and debasement of coins resulted in their falling values with coined silver such as the Peso already prevalent in the south bronze was largely replaced as the medium of exchange within Jiangnan who valued the standardised peso. Additionally, bronze and silver were not exchanged at a fixed rate and thus the demand for exchange varied wildly seasonally and even more so over time with the falling demand for bronze the price of silver relative increased dramatically. In Hebei 2300 bronze coins were required for a tael of silver in 1850 when in 1820, 1250 was sufficient; simultaneously the prices in Jiangsu rose to 2000 whilst in Zhejiang where silver was predominant the price did not rise above 1700. This difference of exchange at a local level is a key indicator of the different demands and supply of the currencies as the demand for bronze fell much more than the supply of silver did the exchange rate swung markedly towards silver.

== Revenue ==
=== The administration of taxation ===
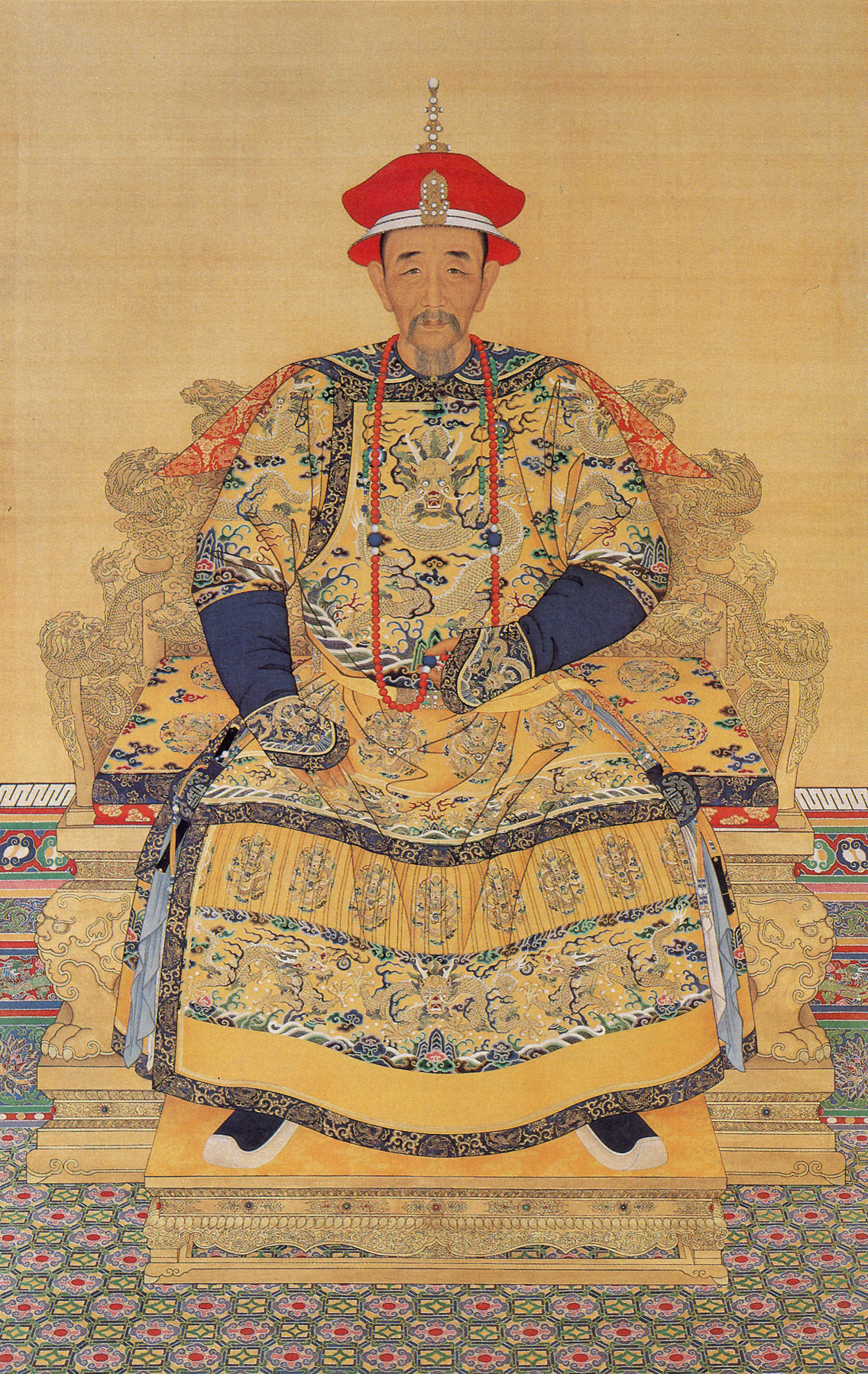
A portrait of the Kangxi Emperor the longest official ruler of the Qing dynasty.

The Qing system of taxation was highly decentralised with the Throne assigning quotas for taxation on a local basis with the county or other government body providing the amount demanded by Beijing and keeping the rest for its own spending, the system of taxation was reliant overwhelmingly on the land and both its qualitative and quantitative value as well as a tax on registered male labourers per household, given the Qing did not register all land exchanges or movement of people this made the system reliant on frequent surveys which were carried out very rarely at a national level and infrequently at a local level leading to revenue struggling to keep pace with the growing expenses. The bulk of tax collection was conducted by the Lijia which consisted of 110 households divided into 11 groups of 10, the Lijia reported directly to the county government, the quotas issued to Beijing would be sent to the provinces who subdivided it per county who then subdivided it per Lijia. Theoretically, this would result in an equal tax burden per household but in reality the Lijia members often negotiated amongst themselves as how to raise the revenue required for the quota to be fulfilled or to discuss a waiving of the taxes due to natural disaster which was a practice the Qing Emperors allowed inline with Confucian political thought.

=== High Qing ===
==== Formal Taxation ====
The Qing system of government finance was extremely decentralised without any singular budget being published and taxes being allocated ad hoc so this precludes any reliable collection of data and leads to discrepancies between sources, therefore only estimates can be provided. The government also inline with Confucian political thought at the time did little investment within the economy beyond what was viewed as strictly necessary such as providing for defense and internal order. The Qing practice of largely drawing upon a land-poll tax also limited the amount revenue could be increased as only population growth and clearing/conquering new land could lead to large revenue increases, this can be seen as revenue only increased from 36,100,000 taels in 1725 to 43,300,000 taels in 1812 before actually declining to 38,600,000 taels in 1841. In a similar period of time the population increased from less than 200,000,000 to over 400,000,000 yet revenue scarcely increased for the Throne (provincial and local budgets did rise). The principal reason for this stagnation was the fixing of head tax rates by the Kangxi Emperor in 1712 which created a very inelastic revenue system which was very inflexible the Qing government had to devise workarounds to raise revenue, these included the meltage fee (a tax on appraisal of coinage) which was given to the officials as a way to combat corruption by accounting for their lack of pay. The second was making taxpayers pay for the collection costs, the third was the autonomy afforded to officials to set the official exchange rate from copper cash to grain or silver which would be accepted thus allowing for an artificial exchange rate to be set to allow for increased collection.

===== Kangxi =====
During the early 1700s the Qing had recovered from the demographic disaster represented in the Ming-Qing transition and expenses rose yet revenue did not as the mobile populace and administrative/financial impediments prevented regular independent surveys as the local communities deliberately underreported their status to avoid taxes, this was remedied by the Kangxi emperor who absorbed the head tax into the poll tax creating a fixed quota of 3,350,000 taels on top of the land tax whilst the amount could be lowered in case of disaster it was expressly stated by Kangxi that it would never be risen.

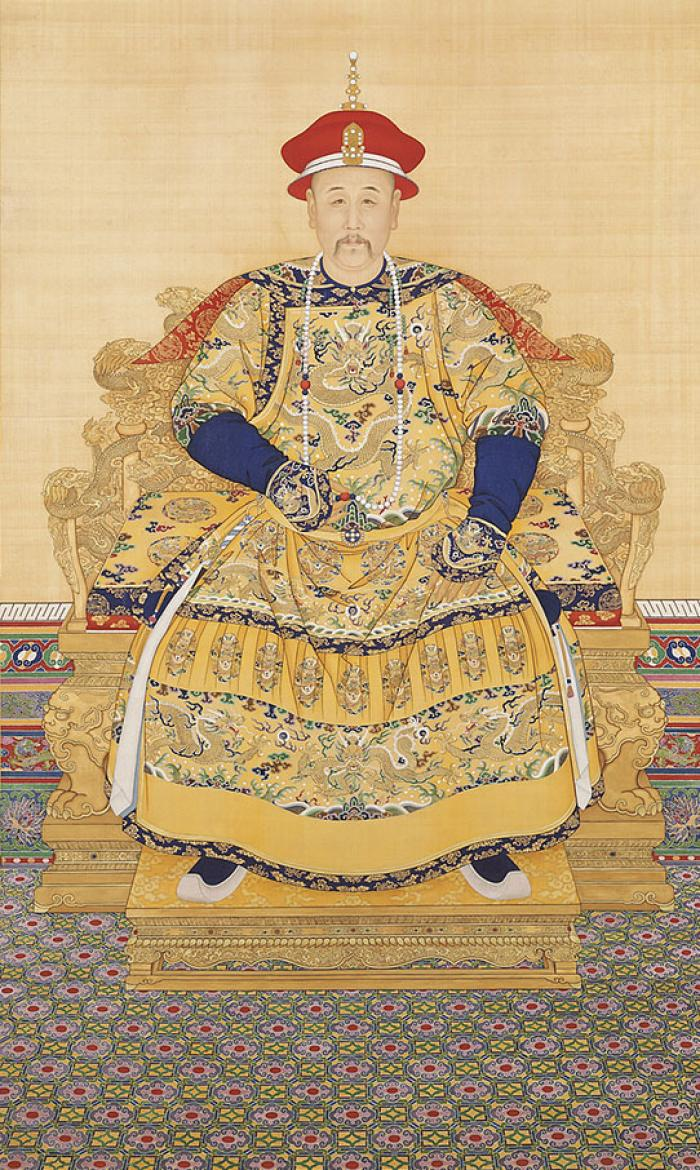
The Yongzheng Emperor who attempted in his brief reign to reform the fiscal administration of the dynasty.

===== Yongzheng =====
However, the reforms of Kangxi did not fix the budget deficit as expenses continued to rise and were accounted for at a local level by a multitude of surcharges levied atop regular taxation despite the illegality of such surcharges per Qing law, the extent of these surcharges varied locally but could amount to up to 80% of the formal tax quota a substantial amount of money these surcharges paid for local administrator salaries and services such as legal and policing services as well as some small-scale infrastructure works such as waterworks. This system of informal unregulated taxation naturally led to corruption as administrators would manipulate exchange rates and pocket the surplus or they would levy direct taxes atop the land tax such as the meltage fee this corruption often affected the smaller landholders and tax payers as they lacked the influence and power to challenge corruption which the gentry and larger landholders held.

The Yongzheng emperor attempted to reign in corruption and malpractice regarding surcharges by a formalisation of the system where the meltage fee (huohao) depending on local circumstances became a formalised tax atop the land tax from 10 to 30% and was used to pay for the salaries of local officials and therefore prevent excessive surcharges which previously exceeded 30%. However, this did not prevent the additional surcharges as the primary reason for their existence was the absence of central government monitoring which was combatted through targeted auditing in corruption prone areas and the system worked.

===== Qianlong =====
By the time of the Qianlong Emperor the rate of surcharges steadily increased once again and senior officials memorialised the throne appealing for the reversal of reforms as the surcharges were once again applied atop the meltage which was applied atop the poll tax which was applied atop the land tax thus leading to an overburdened populace despite these appeals the meltage fee remained in existence and as corruption rose as Qianlong's reign continued the rate of surcharges increased continually to the level that the Yongzheng saw necessary to implement reform. The reason for this continued corruption was the lack of formal oversight as the Qing bureaucracy remained stagnant in numbers despite a doubling of the population of the empire and collection of taxes was not administered by the Bureaucracy but instead was delegated to the local elite. This stagnation persisted from Yongzheng until the Taiping era as land tax beyond minimal changes responding to war or calamity did not change nor did the amount of bureaucrats, no land surveys were conducted and the 1690 tax registers continued in usage, only the commercial and salt taxes saw rising revenue but even these then stagnated by the middle of the 18th century; thus in 1835 the Qing government was broadly working with the same revenue it had in 1735.

Formal Taxation figures
Date	Land-poll tax	Grain tribute (shi)*	Meltage fee	Salt tax	Tariffs	Misc.	Total(excl. grain)
1685 (Early Kangxi)	27,270,000	4,330,000	N/A	2,760,000	1,200,000	910,000	32,140,000
1725 (Early Yongzheng)	30,070,000	4,730,000	4,000,000	4,430,000	1,350,000	990,000	40,840,000
1753 (Early Qianlong)	29,380,000	8,400,000	3,000,000 (1766)	7,010,000	4,300,000	1,420,000	45,110,000
1812 (Mid Jiaqing)	29,530,000	7,400,000 (1820)	4,500,000	5,790,000	4,810,000	1,510,000	46,140,000
1841 (Mid Daoguang)	29,430,000	7,400,000 (1820)	N/A	7,470,000	4,350,000	N/A	41,250,000

*A shi of grain fluctuated around 2 taels for the entire period within the table

==== Informal taxation ====
Separate from previous formal taxation was a large tax demanded informally as the grain and land-poll tax. Though little figures exist given the informal nature of these taxes, the local governments collected an additional 50-60% that was demanded in formal taxation. When averaged nationally, as per the estimates of the provincial government themselves, the actual revenue was more akin to 50,000,000 taels annually and that of the grain tax being nearly 20,000,000 Shi.

=== Late Qing ===
==== 1850-1894 ====
The effects of the mid-century rebellions and the Opium wars necessitated a large fiscal reform. The first of these was the large expansion of customs and the founding of the Imperial Maritime Customs service, which in 1854 began to regularly remit the revenue directly to the Throne rather than to the provinces. This allowed the government to increase spending rapidly and to combat the mid-century rebellions as its basic fiscal system began to collapse.

The provincial governments, under pressure from the Throne to "donate" money to fund suppression of rebellions, sought to formalise the surcharges upon taxes (chiefly the grain tax) that the Emperors themselves refused to formalise. In Hunan this was a 130% surcharge, 100% of which went to the military and 30% to provincial needs. This measure, first approved by Luo Bingzhang, was then rapidly applied in Hubei, Jiangxi, and Anhui, boosting their total revenues by up to 15%. The formalisation was accompanied by the abolition of the informal charges and punitive measures for any further extraction. This, in Hubei, reduced the burden of taxation by 8,000 cash coins per shi of land, a marked decrease from the 13,000 per shi. Thus, the policies of the Yongzheng emperor were restored a century after their introduction and subsequent repeal. However, unlike the era of Yongzheng, these measures were not repaid, as memorials to reverse the reforms were vigorously opposed by Liu Kunyi, who attacked the opposition. And highlighting their own tax dodging, the Throne sided with Liu and the measures remained in place as the Throne argued that since the new taxes had been in place for over 10 years, and had not caused unrest, their permanence was acceptable to the masses.

The second tax created in the period was the Likin, which was broadly beyond the control of the Throne as the provinces set, collected, and spent the tax almost entirely independently. The Likin, itself a response to the mid-century rebellions, was created to finance the armies used to crush the rebellions. It was an ad valorem internal transit tax with rates set below 10%, and most commonly at 2% per tax barrier; the tax was further collected at the production of the good and also at its sale point. Thus, a good could be taxed multiple times as it travelled through China. This provided over 10,000,000 taels to the Qing as its implementation expanded throughout the nation during the 1850s and 1860s. The tax was split into 3 parts that which was reported to the Throne which was further subdivided into that which went into the coffers of the Throne (20%) and that which remained with the provincial coffers (80%), the third portion was the unreported portion which was entirely retained by the provincial government.

These new taxes allowed the Qing to suppress the many rebellions and expend the required 70,000,000 taels to do so, but even these were not sufficient and a budget deficit of 10,000,000 taels remained the normal amount for the next decade.

The Qing government in the Tongzhi restoration was beset by a series of debates over the existence of Lijin, one of the proponents of the tax described the tax as merely trimming the branches of a tree which are superfluous as opposed to trimming the roots which represented the peasantry which would weaken the whole structure, thus the Lijin was preferred as it would dampen investment in mercantile activities and by extension industry though this was not considered at this point, it would instead drive investment towards agriculture which had a proportionally lower tax burden. The Qing government maintained its fiscally conservative and Malthusian ideology refusing to increase agricultural taxation whilst drawing upon the commercial sector for revenue. This was the opposite of Japan where the government introduced a universal land tax and invested into industry and commerce; these policies hindered industrial development.

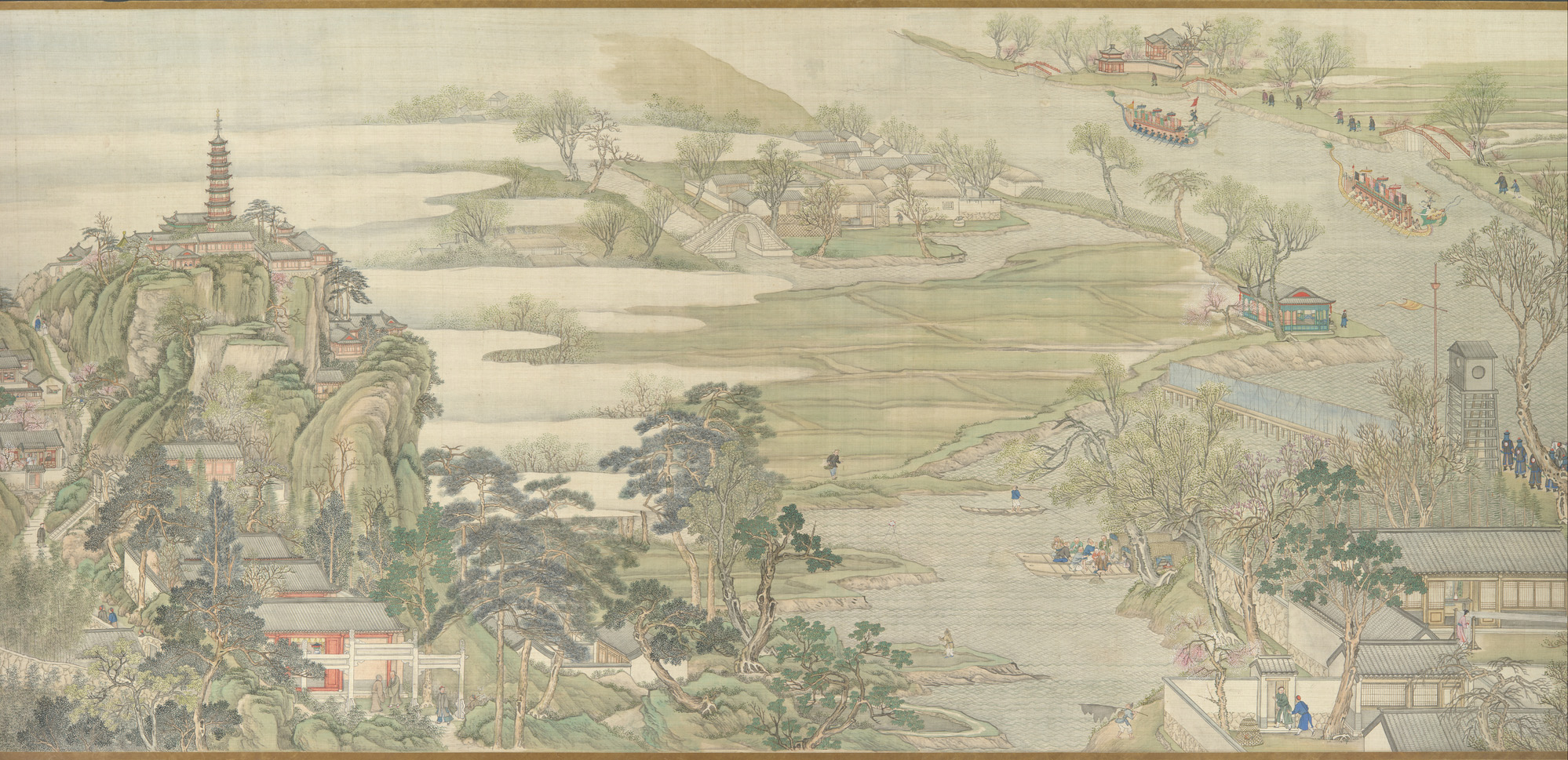
The Grand Canal whose waters both fed North China and provided money for the government.

The Throne itself did institute some fiscal reform largely in the 1870s-1880s as the Hubu sought to directly raise revenues as the nation stabilised following the mid-century calamities these contributed to the overall doubling of the Throne revenue which occurred in the period 1850-1890 these reforms were mostly in the form of the salt tax and miscellaneous taxes and paled in comparison to the Likin and Customs revenue.

However, despite the need for more revenue by the end of the rebellions the Qing government actually reduced taxation in the lower Yangtze region in Zhejiang this amounted to a 20% tax cut equivalent to 800,000 shi for the grain tax, simultaneously the provincial authorities further cut down on informal taxation reducing taxation by a further 860,000 shi and 3,500,000 strings of copper cash, there was no attempt to later bring back these taxes and instead further petitions were made to the throne to reduce taxation even further, the only exception was Sichuan which was historically undertaxed due to the severe destruction of the Ming-Qing transition which severely depopulated the province, the surcharges remained in force in Sichuan as it only brought the taxation levels in line with the rest of China and did not represent an additional burden beyond normal levels of taxation.

The increase in taxes brought about by the Hubu and in local areas was outpaced by growing expenditures as the campaign to retake Xinjiang and other expenses in the province totalled 50,000,000 taels and the Sino-French war a further 30,000,000 taels natural disasters as well as their prevention amounted to another 30,000,000 as well as 19 years of 5,000,000 (45,000,000) being spent on the Imperial navy equivalent to nearly two years' expenditure.

Revenue and expenditure
Tax	Edkins(1893)	Fairbank(1890-1895 average)	Pao Chao (1887)	Zhang
Land-poll tax	23,329,534	25,088,000	31,184,042	23,170,000
Miscellaneous taxes	1,732,319	5,500,000		7,780,000
Rent from state property	721,504	N/A		
Grain tax	4,447,764	6,562,000	123,600	8,400,000
Opium duty		2,229,000		
Meltage fee	3,036,736	N/A		3,000,000
Salt tax	7,679,829	13,659,000	12,500,000	13,650,000
Native customs	2,844,375	1,000,000		
Likin	14,277,304	12,952,000 (excl. opium and salt)	16,548,199	12,950,000
Foreign Customs	16,801,180	21,989,000		22,990,000
Title purchases	4,090,171	(in miscellaneous)		
Payment of previously postponed taxation	2,093,993			
Surplus caused by troop disbandment	2,055,301			
Grain tax collected in kind			3,624,532 Shih of rice 52,441,600 catties of hay	
Grand Total	83,110,009	88,979,000	60,355,841	91,940,000

The revenue according to the existing data is to be assumed to be around 80–90,000,000 taels as the incomplete data of Pao Chao falls short of the others though the indidivdual taxes listed are higher the lack of other taxes makes it difficult to achieve a complete image.

Lijin tax collection
Regions	1866	1874	1880	1885	1893
Zhili		79,000	300,383		276,299
Guangdong		1,200,000			
Fujian		1,800,000			
Jiangsu		3,000,000	2,281,181		2,400,000
Liangjiang (incl. Jiangsu)		5,000,000			
Hubei	736,000+				
Shanxi	448,100+				
Jiangxi	647,000+				
Hunan	680,000+				
Sichuan				200,000+	
Total	2,511,1000	8,079,000	2,581,564	200,000	2,676,299

==== Land Surveys ====
Following the introduction of the land survey ban in the 1740s no land surveys were conducted in the Qing dynasty until a century later in the 1850s when Hu Linyi ordered the implementation of new surveys to implement the other reform policy of formalising surcharges, this initial reform was slow but as the 1860s and 1870s progressed stability was restored and more provinces carried out renewed surveys. There was no opposition from the throne and what little local opposition remained was overcome by the pressing demand for revenue brought about by rebellion eventually even the frontier regions of Xinjiang, Taiwan and Manchuria carried out surveys and official tillage increased by over 10% from 800,000,000 mu to 910,000,000 but given the local nature and weak Qing bureaucracy it is probable that the actual figure was in excess of this figure.

==== 1894-1911 ====
Following the First Sino-Japanese war the financial burden on the Qing government was increased heavily as not only did it contract loans to pay for the war it additionally had to pay the large indemnity dictated by the Treaty of Shimonoseki, in the period of 1894-1898 the Qing government contracted a total of 350,457,485 taels in loans with varying interest rates (4.5%-7%). These additional expenditures completely set aside the ramshackle balanced budget maintained by the Qing government until this point and the weight of interest payments and loan repayment necessitated a further increase in revenue. Further loans were contracted after the Boxer rebellion not only for the Boxer indemnity but also for other requirements particularly railways, between 1894 and 1911 a total of 746,220,453 taels of loans were arranged 330,500,000 of which was for railway construction and secured by the railways themselves and thus did not represent a burden on the government directly, 25,500,000 was borrowed for industrial purposes namely the Hanyang works, 5,400,000 for telegraphic infrastructure and 640,000 for miscellaneous purposes. These loans and indemnities were almost entirely secured on existing taxes and thus the Hubu was robbed of millions of taels in revenue creating a deficit of nearly 17,000,000 taels.

By 1899 the central government expenditure reached 101,000,000 taels on a revenue of 88,400,000 taels the largest of these expenditures was foreign debt service which amounted to 30% of the revenue and to pay off existing debts further loans were contracted creating a never-ending cycle of debt as the Qing government proved unwilling to raise taxes on agriculture its largest economic sector.

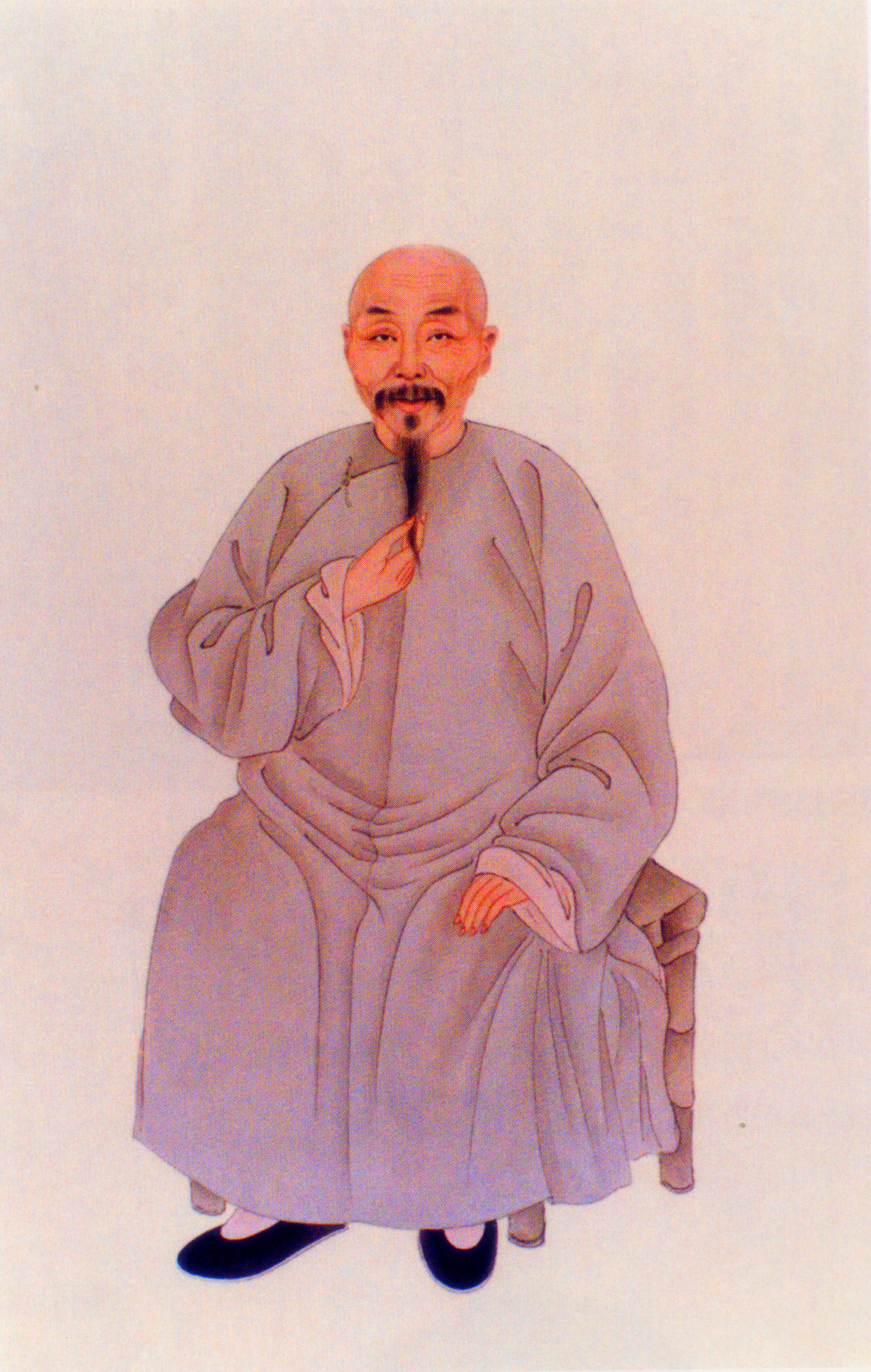
Feng Guifen, proposer of the much delayed transition from grain to silver tax collection

There was an attempt to raise money via public bonds: a total of 100,000,000 was offered at 5% interest for a period of 20 years. However, the merchants and gentry and other potential lenders found the terms extortionate and did not trust the government to pay back the funding and the bonds were suspended after 1,000,000 were sold.

The Qing government managed to pay back nearly 477,000,000 taels in principal and interest before its collapse this was double the entire capitalisation of Qing industrial enterprises both domestic and foreign and was largely financed by an increased tax burden on the common citizen though the initial burden itself was extremely light and there is no direct correlation between increased taxes and the Xinhai revolution despite common depictions of the heavy taxes of the Qing government. Though this still left £139,000,000 (equivalent to over 600,000,000 taels) of debt outstanding which was placed on the shoulders of the equally ineffective Republic of China.

===== Grain transport =====
The transportation of grain firstly by the Grand Canal and then by ship was an important part of the Qing system of rule as the grain transported was responsible for not only feeding the Imperial court but also the Bannermen and their families however in 1901 this system was abandoned due to its inherent inefficiency due to its costs as well as causing suffering due to the taxation needed to finance it. The provinces were ordered instead to sell the grain collected for silver and instead ship this at a minimal cost with the surplus being held for the Hubu, this proposal originally made by Feng Guifen decades prior was adopted after his death. By Feng's account each picul (equivalent to shih) of grain cost 18 taels to transport, however in 1901 the transport was mostly done by ship and therefore immensely cheaper at only 80% of a tael per picul/shih, meaning total transportation cost per Pao Chao would be just under 2,900,000 taels annually; a great saving.

=== Final reforms ===
In 1901 the weight of the Boxer indemnity finally awakened the Qing Court to its fiscal weakness and the need for reform was unavoidable. Thus for the first time since the 1720s the formal agricultural tax was raised in gradual stages from 1901 to 1911 by 18,000,000 taels a large increase in a virtually stagnant form of taxation amounting to over 50%. However, even this 50% increase left Qing agricultural taxes at less than 1% or even 0.3% as per the Imperial Maritime Customs Service which estimated that even a 1% tax would yield 250,000,000 taels, even when compared to the agricultural India which possessed at that time half the arable land of China the Raj still managed to collect 100,000,000 taels equivalent in taxation.

The largest change however was the replacement of the system of quotas where the government spent only as its revenue allowed it to with a fully comprehensive budget where revenue was expected to catch expenditures flipping the entire foundation of State finances upon its head. The first implementations of the budget were in direct response to the Boxer indemnity as the share of the indemnity was passed to the provinces who were expected to contribute, Hubei raised its agricultural taxes by 30% and instituted a budget to allow for its contribution to be paid off on time this was followed by other provinces, in Zhili for example agricultural taxation doubled. The Central government followed soon after ordering audits and raising taxes universally for a dramatic increase in its budget to over 200,000,000 taels with 80,000,000 coming from the Salt, Lijin and commercial taxes and the rest from agriculture and tariffs. Thus, revenue rose from 90,000,000 in 1894 to 123,000,000 in 1908 to over 200,000,000 in 1911.

== See also ==
- Economic history of China before 1912
- Economy of the Han dynasty
- Economy of the Song dynasty
- Economy of the Ming dynasty
- Criticism of Qing dynasty's economic performance
- Paper money of the Qing dynasty
- Qing dynasty coinage
