= Mark Elvin =

Australian academic (1938–2023)

John Mark Dutton Elvin FAHA (18 August 1938 – 6 December 2023) was an English and Australian academic. A professor emeritus of Chinese history at Australian National University, he specialised in the late imperial period. He was also emeritus fellow of St Antony's College, Oxford.

== Early life ==
Elvin, the only child of Lionel Elvin and Mona Bedortha Dutton, was born on 18 August 1938. He grew up in Cambridge, attended The Dragon School, and matriculated as an undergraduate at King's College, Cambridge. He held posts at the University of Glasgow and at St. Antony's College, Oxford.

== Career ==
Having taught previously in Cambridge and Glasgow, Elvin was appointed as the chair in Chinese history at the Institute of Advanced Studies at the Australian National University, Canberra in 1990 and worked there until he retired in 2006, at which point he and his wife returned to England.

Elvin is noted for his high-level equilibrium trap theory, proposed in his first book, The Pattern of the Chinese Past, to explain why an industrial revolution happened in Europe but not in China, despite the fact that the state of scientific knowledge was far more advanced in China, much earlier than in Europe. Elvin proposed that pre-industrial production methods were extremely efficient in China, which obviated much of the economic pressure for scientific progress. At the same time, a philosophical shift occurred, whereby Taoism was gradually replaced by Confucianism as the dominant intellectual paradigm, and moral philosophy and the development of rigid social organization became more important than scientific inquiry among intellectuals.

Elvin was elected a Corresponding Fellow of the Australian Academy of the Humanities in 1993.

== Death ==
Elvin died on 6 December 2023, at the age of 85.

== Works ==
Monographs

- The Pattern of the Chinese Past: A Social and Economic Interpretation (Eyre Methuen, 1973; Stanford University Press, 1973)
- Another History: Essays on China from a European Perspective (Wild Peony, 1996)
- Changing Stories in the Chinese World (Stanford University Press, 1997)
- Sediments of Time: Environment and Society in Chinese History (Cambridge University Press, 1998)
- The Retreat of the Elephants: An Environmental History of China (Yale University Press, 2006)

Other works

- Commerce and Society in Sung China (Center for Chinese Studies, University of Michigan, 1970) - translation of Yoshinobu Shiba
- Chinese Cities Since the Sung Dynasty (Cambridge University Press, 1978)
- Cultural Atlas of China (Oxford: Phaidon, 1983; Facts of Fi;e, 1983; rev. ed.: 1998) (joint author: Caroline Blunden)

== See also ==
- Great Divergence
